= Mount Eniwa =

Active volcano on the island of Hokkaido in Japan

- 恵庭岳
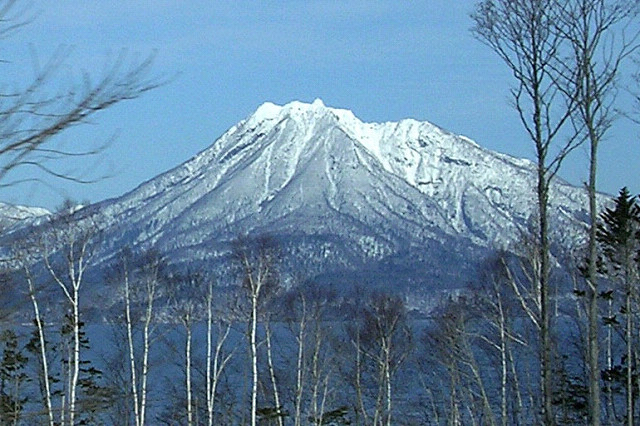
- From Lake Shikotsu, March 2007

Highest point
- Elevation: 1,320 m (4,330 ft)
- Listing: List of mountains and hills of Japan by height
- Coordinates: 42°47′36″N 141°17′8″E

Geography
- Location within Japan Location within Hokkaido Location within Sapporo
- Location: Hokkaido, Japan
- Parent range: Nasu Volcanic Zone
- Topo map(s): Geographical Survey Institute (国土地理院, Kokudochiriin) 25000:1 恵庭岳, 50000:1 樽前山

Geology
- Rock age: Holocene
- Mountain type: Stratovolcano
- Volcanic arc: Northeastern Japan Arc
- Last eruption: 1707 ± 30

Climbing
- Easiest route: Hike

Mount Eniwa (Japanese: 恵庭岳, Hepburn: Eniwa-dake) is an active volcano located in Shikotsu-Tōya National Park in Hokkaido, Japan. It sits opposite Mount Tarumae and Mount Fuppushi on the shores of Lake Shikotsu, the caldera lake that spawned the volcanoes. Mount Eniwa is the tallest of the three volcanoes.

== Eruptions ==
The last eruption occurred around the start of the 18th century (c. 1700 ±30 years). There are no historical records of this, but tephrochronology indicates phreatic explosions with mudflows from crater 3. Two centuries before this eruption (c. 1550 ±75 years), radiocarbon dating indicates a similar eruption from crater 2. Around the same time (c. 1500 ±150 years), radiocarbon dating indicates another eruption, but from crater 1. This eruption included debris avalanches instead of mudflows. The oldest eruption that has been dated is an explosive eruption from the east side of the summit around 100 BCE ± 100 years according to radiocarbon dating. All these events were central vent eruptions with a volcanic explosivity index (VEI) of 2.

== Climbing Route ==
A single trail climbs the eastern side of the mountain. It gets progressively steeper. The trail starts in a forest about 1 kilometre (0.6 mi) from Poropinai. The treeline is at about 800 metres (2,600 ft). From there the terrain is rocky and alpine. The climb takes 3–3.5 hours.

== 1972 Winter Olympics ==
At the 1972 Winter Olympics, Mount Eniwa was the site of the men's and women's downhill ski races. The course started at the summit and finished on the southwest slope. The technical events of giant slalom and slalom were held at Teine.
