= Mount Fuppushi =

Dormant volcano on the island of Hokkaido, Japan

- 風不死岳
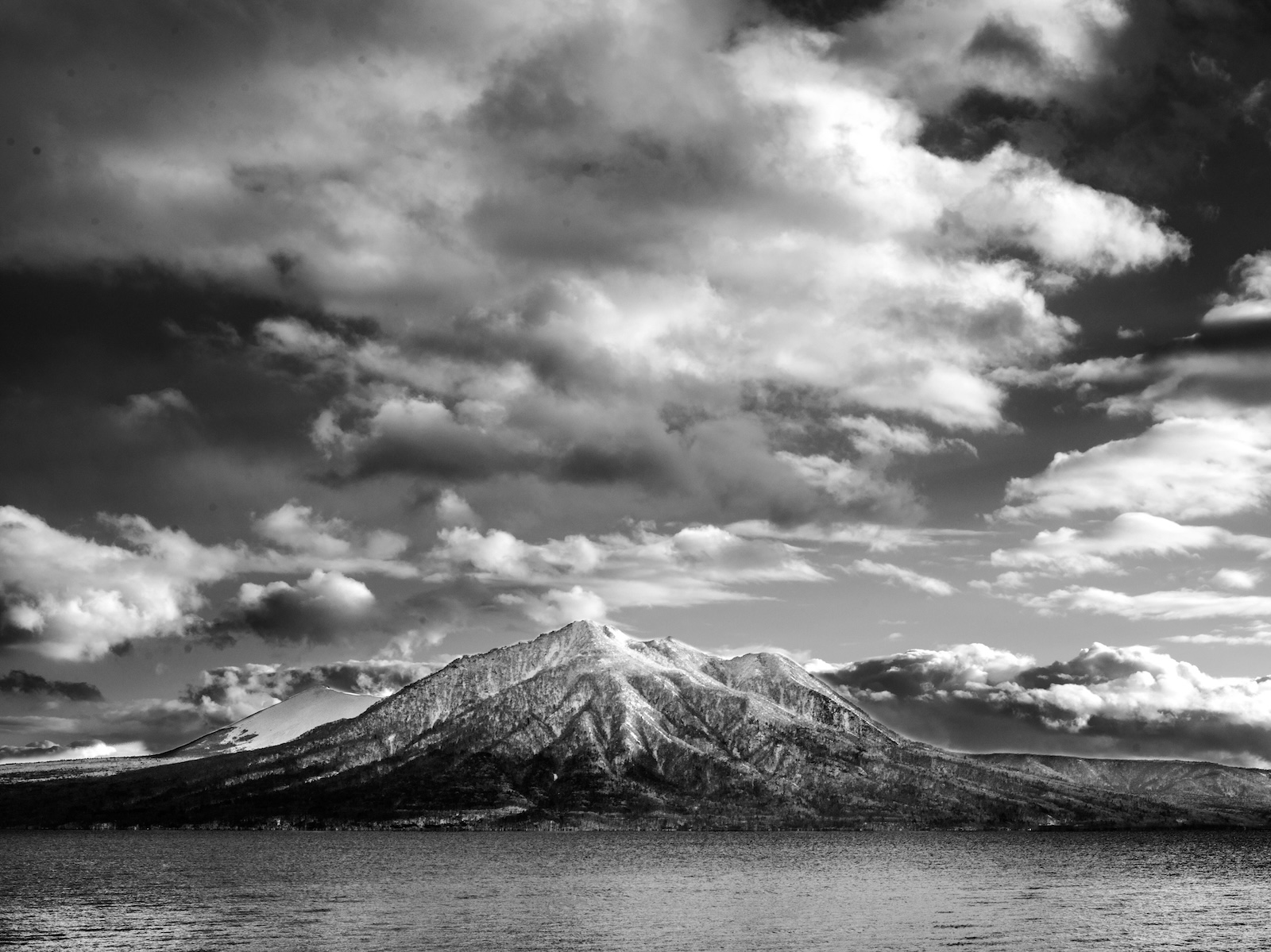
- Mount Fuppushi volcanic peak within Shikotsu-Toya National Park in Hokkaido, Japan

Highest point
- Elevation: 1,102.6 m (3,617 ft)
- Listing: List of mountains and hills of Japan by height
- Coordinates: 42°43′1″N 141°21′32″E

Geography
- Location within Japan Location within Hokkaido
- Location: Hokkaido, Japan
- Topo map(s): Geographical Survey Institute (国土地理院, Kokudochiriin) 25000:1 風不死岳, 25000:1 樽前山, 50000:1 樽前山

Geology
- Rock age: Holocene
- Mountain type: Stratovolcano
- Volcanic arc: Northeastern Japan Arc
- Last eruption: 10 ka

Mount Fuppushi (風不死岳, Fuppushi-dake) is a dormant volcano located in Shikotsu-Toya National Park in Hokkaido, Japan. It sits adjacent to Mount Tarumae and opposite Mount Eniwa. Mount Fuppushi is on the south shore of Lake Shikotsu, the caldera lake that spawned the volcanoes.

== See also ==
- List of volcanoes in Japan
