= Tōyako =

Tōyako may refer to:

- Lake Tōya, known as "Tōyako" in Japanese, a volcanic caldera lake in Shikotsu-Toya National Park, Abuta District, Iburi Subprefecture, Hokkaidō, Japan
- Tōyako, Hokkaido, a town in Abuta District, Iburi Subprefecture, Hokkaidō, Japan
