= Chitose =

Chitose (千歳) may refer to:

== People ==
- Chitose Hajime (born 1979), J-Pop singer
- Chitose Morinaga, Japanese voice actress
- Chitose Yagami (born 1969), Japanese manga artist
- Tsuyoshi Chitose (born 1898), founder of Chito-ryu karate
- Chitose Maki, Japanese manga artist

== Places in Japan ==
- Chitose, Hokkaido, a city on the island of Hokkaidō
- Chitose River, a river on the island of Hokkaidō
- Chitose, Ōita, a small village located in Ōno District, Ōita Prefecture
- New Chitose Airport, serving the Sapporo metropolitan area
- Chitose Air Base, a Japan Air Self-Defense Force base located in Chitose, Hokkaidō

== Ships ==
- Japanese cruiser Chitose, a 1897 protected cruiser of the Imperial Japanese Navy
- Japanese aircraft carrier Chitose, a light aircraft carrier which served in World War II, built 1934
- JDS Chitose, a destroyer escort of the chikugo class launched in 1971

== Fictional characters ==
- Chitose Hitotose (仁歳 チトセ, Hitotose Chitose), the protagonist of the anime series Happy Lesson
- Chitose Shirakawa a character in the light novel anime series The Angel Next Door Spoils Me Rotten
- Chitose Akiyama, a character in the Japanese manga and anime Softenni
- Chitose Karasuma (烏丸 千歳), the main protagonist in the media franchise Girlish Number
- Chitose Hibiya, a character in the manga and anime series Chobits
- Chitose Ikeda, a character in the manga and anime series YuruYuri
- Chitose Mihara, a character in the manga Kobato
- Chitose Karasuma (烏丸 ちとせ), a character in the media franchise Galaxy Angel
- Chitose Tateyama, a character in the manga Buso Renkin
- Chitose, a character in the game and media franchise Kantai Collection
- Chitose Karasuyama, a character in the manga series D-Frag!
- Yuma Chitose, a character in the manga Puella Magi Oriko Magica
- Senri Chitose, a character in the manga and anime series The Prince of Tennis
- Sakura Chitose O, a non-playable character in the mobile game Umamusume: Pretty Derby
