= Lake Tōya =

Caldera lake

Lake Tōya 洞爺湖
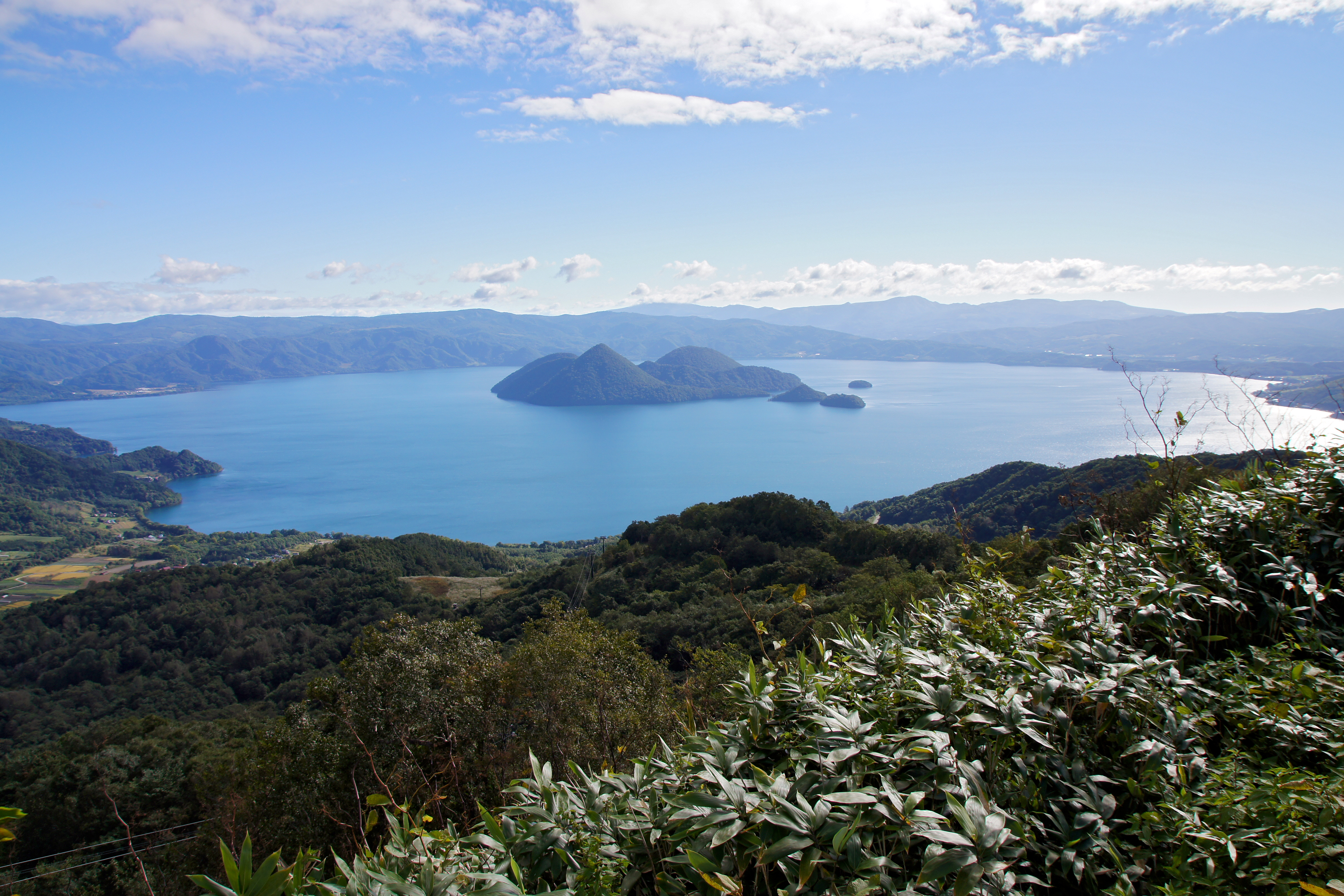
- Lake Tōya (September 2013)

- Location within Japan
- Location: Iburi Subprefecture, Hokkaidō
- Coordinates: 42°34′44″N 140°51′16″E
- Type: oligotrophic crater lake
- Primary inflows: Ō River (大川, Ō-gawa), Sōbetsu River (ソウベツ 川, Sōbetsu-gawa)
- Primary outflows: Sōbetsu River (壮瞥川, Sōbetsu-gawa)
- Basin countries: Japan
- Max. length: 10 km (6.2 mi)
- Max. width: 9 km (5.6 mi)
- Surface area: 70.7 km^{2} (27.3 sq mi)
- Average depth: 117.0 m (383.9 ft)
- Max. depth: 180 m (590 ft)
- Water volume: 8.19 km^{3} (1.96 cu mi)
- Shore length^{1}: 46 km (29 mi)
- Surface elevation: 84 m (276 ft)
- Frozen: never
- Islands: Collectively known as Naka-jima: Ō-shima, Benten-jima, Kannon-jima, Manjū-jima
- Settlements: Sōbetsu, Hokkaidō, Tōyako, Hokkaidō
- ^{1} Shore length is not a well-defined measure.

Lake Tōya (洞爺湖, Tōya-ko) is a volcanic caldera lake in Shikotsu-Toya National Park, Abuta District, Hokkaido, Japan. It is part of "Toya Caldera and Usu Volcano Global Geopark" which joins in Global Geoparks Network. The stratovolcano of Mount Usu lies on the southern rim of the caldera. The lake is nearly circular, being 10 km (6.2 mi) in diameter from the eastwest and 9 km (5.6 mi) from the northsouth. The town of Tōyako comprises most of the area surrounding the lake and the town of Sōbetsu is located on the eastern side.

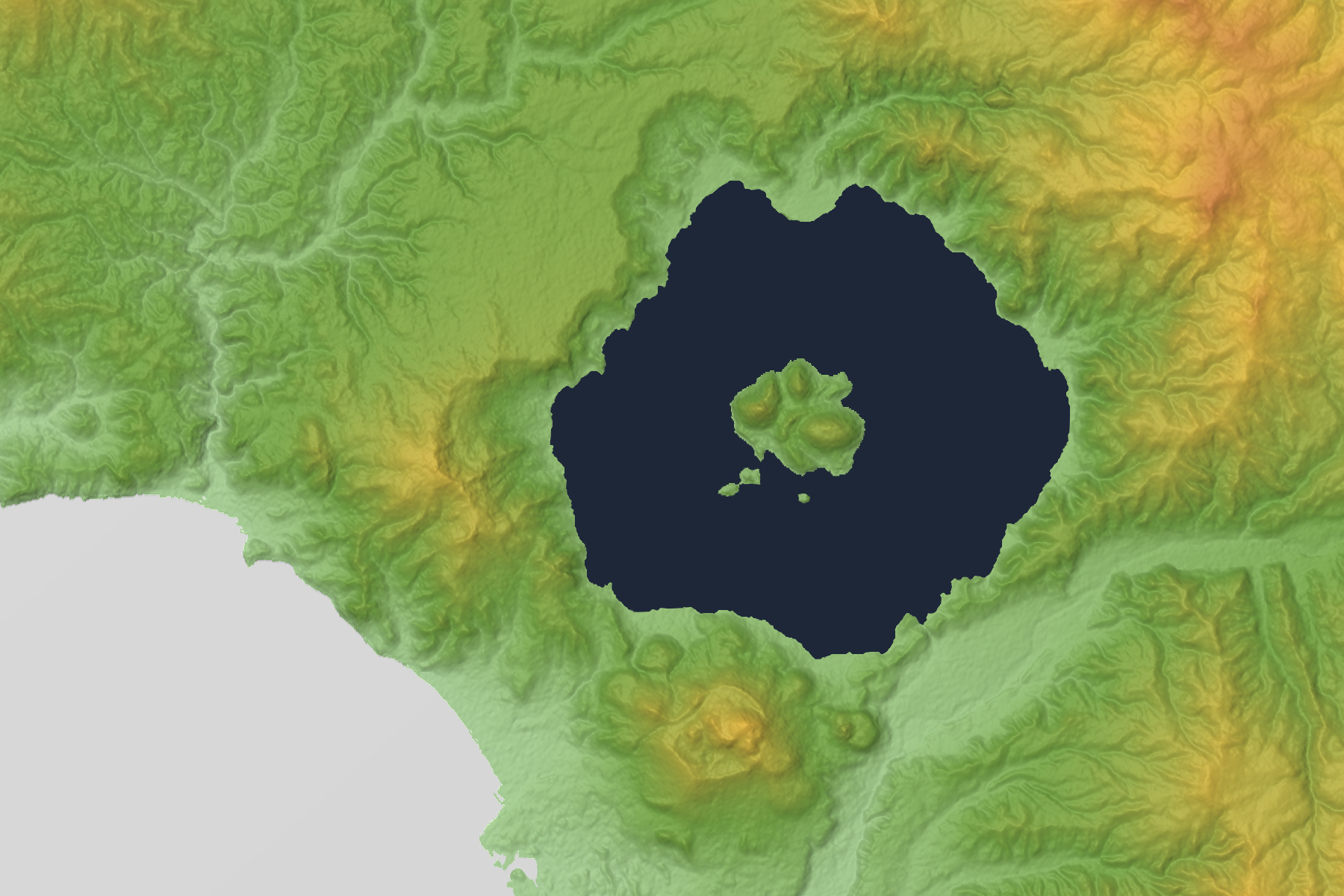
Tōya Caldera

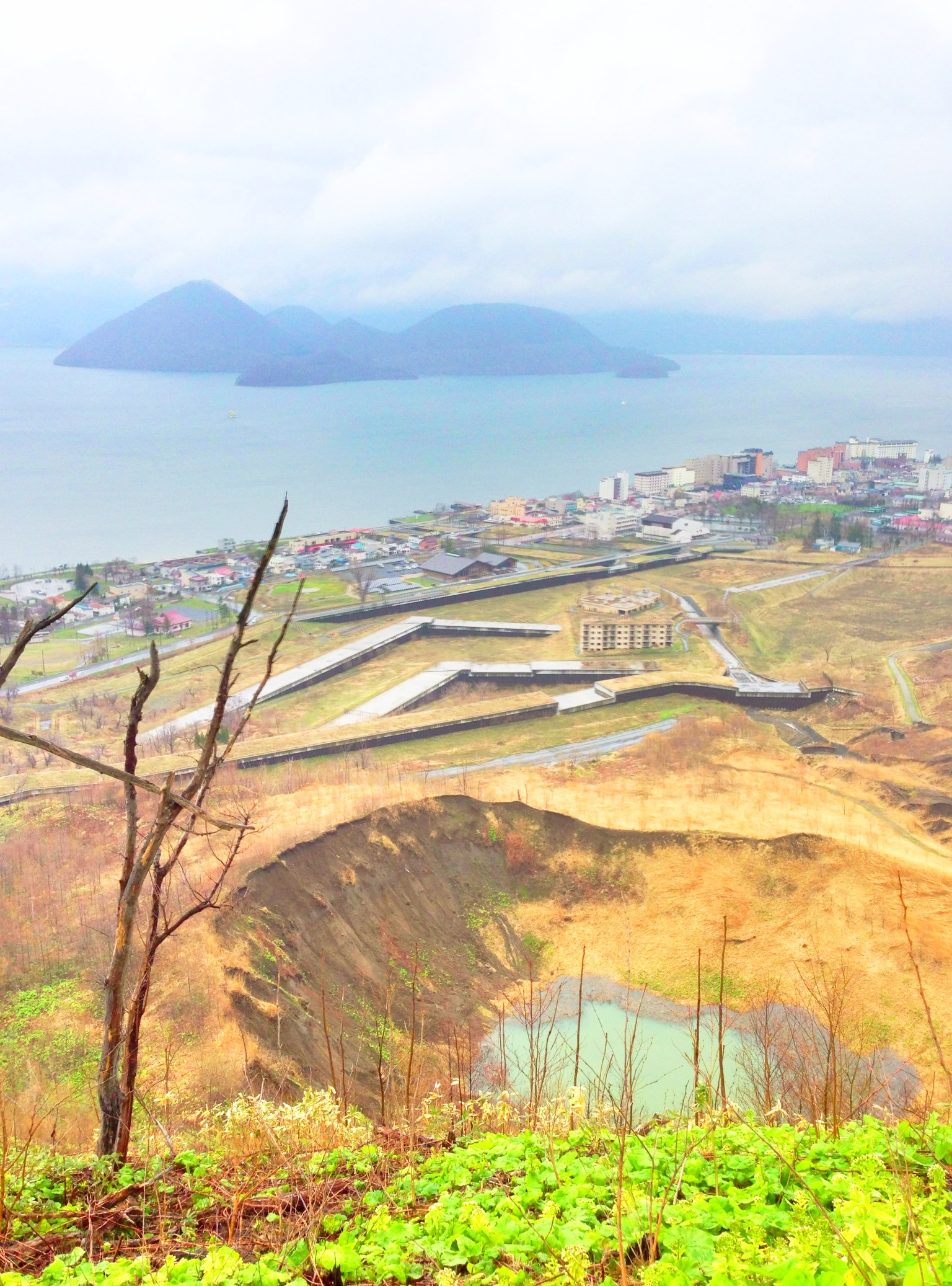
Lake Tōya, Tōya town and volcano Usu

Lake Tōya is said to be the northernmost lake in Japan that never ices (with competing claim by nearby Lake Shikotsu), and the second most transparent lake in Japan. Nakajima Island is a recursive island in the middle of the lake which houses the Tōya Lake Forest Museum.

Lake Tōya was called Kim'un-to (キムウン (kim'un) means "in the mountain" and ト (to) means "lake") by the Ainu. In the Meiji era, Japanese pioneers named the lake Tōya after the Ainu expression to ya, which means "lakeshore, land around a lake."

The 2008 G8 Summit was held at Lake Tōya and The Windsor Hotel Toya Resort & Spa.

== Surroundings ==
Surrounding the lake, there are numerous parks as well as walking trails, such as the Waterfront Forest Lane (Takarada Nature Observation Trail) and the Nishiyama Sanroku Crater Trail. Several onsen managed by the town of Toyako offer a view of the lake. There are also several hand and footbaths nearby. Uniquely, large vending machines near the onsen offer spring water that can be taken to be used at home.

== Gallery ==
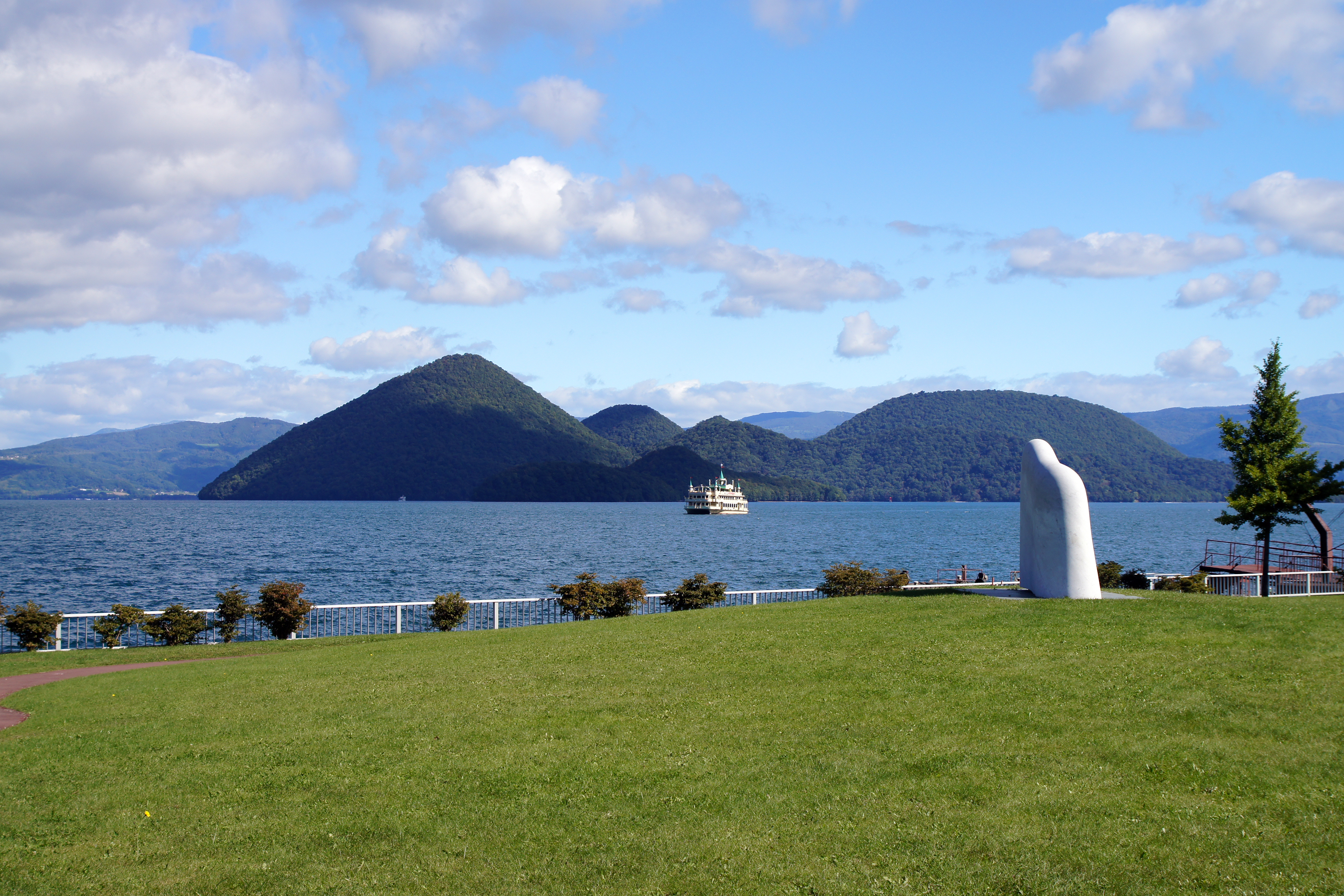
Lake Toya and Nakajima (September 2013)

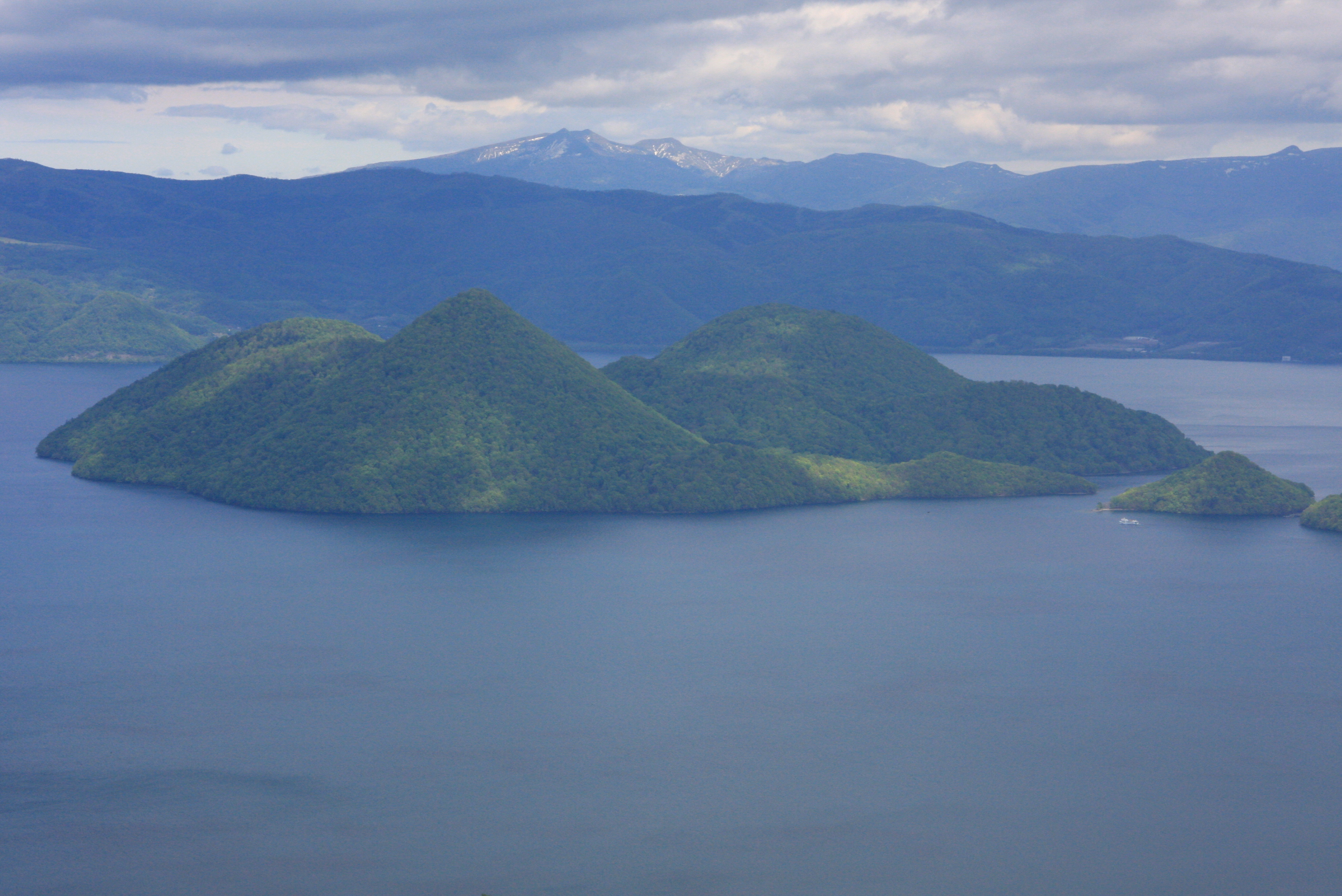
Nakajima seen from Mt. Poromoi (May 2009)

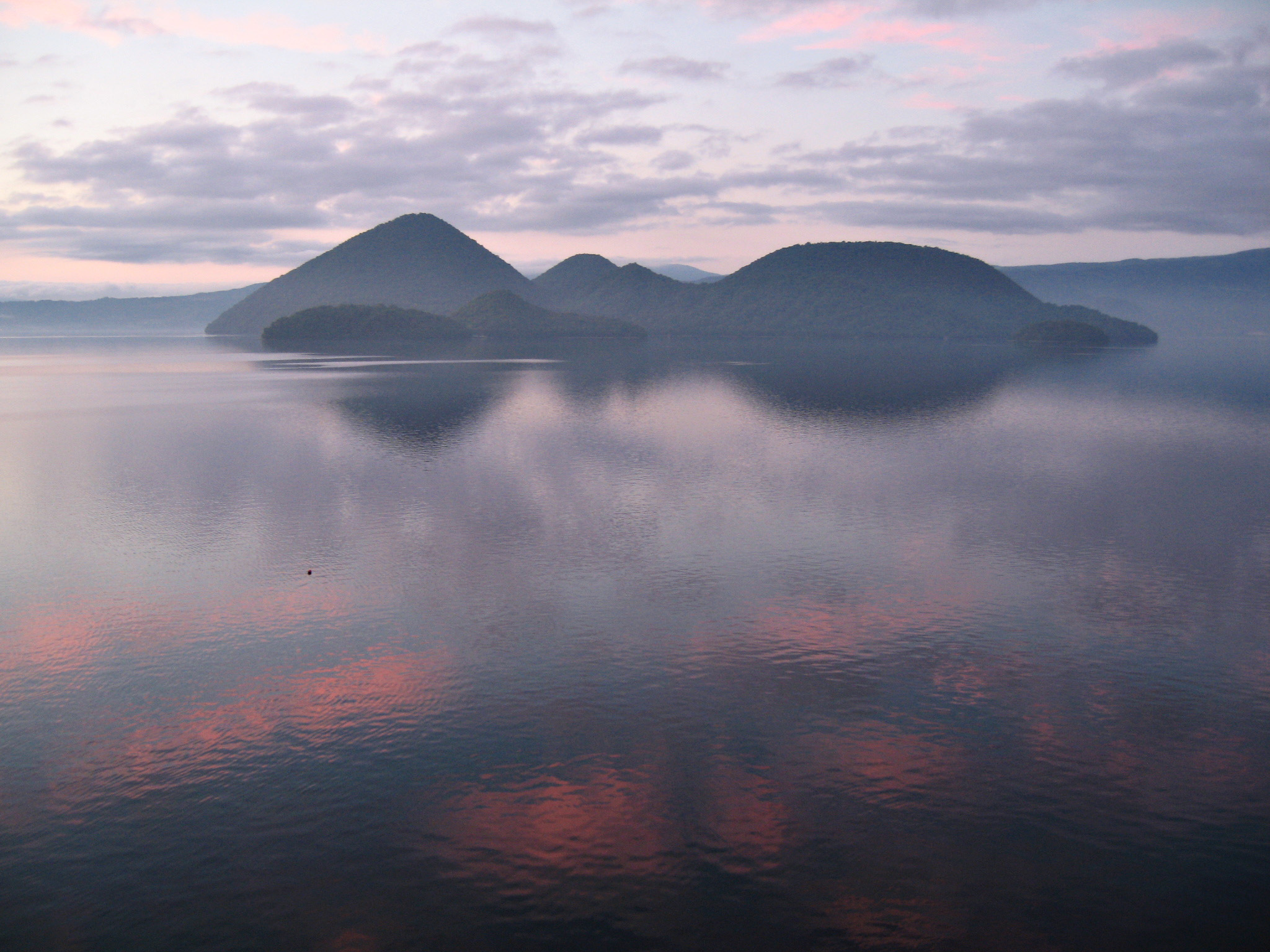
Lake Toya with the calm surface (August 2007)

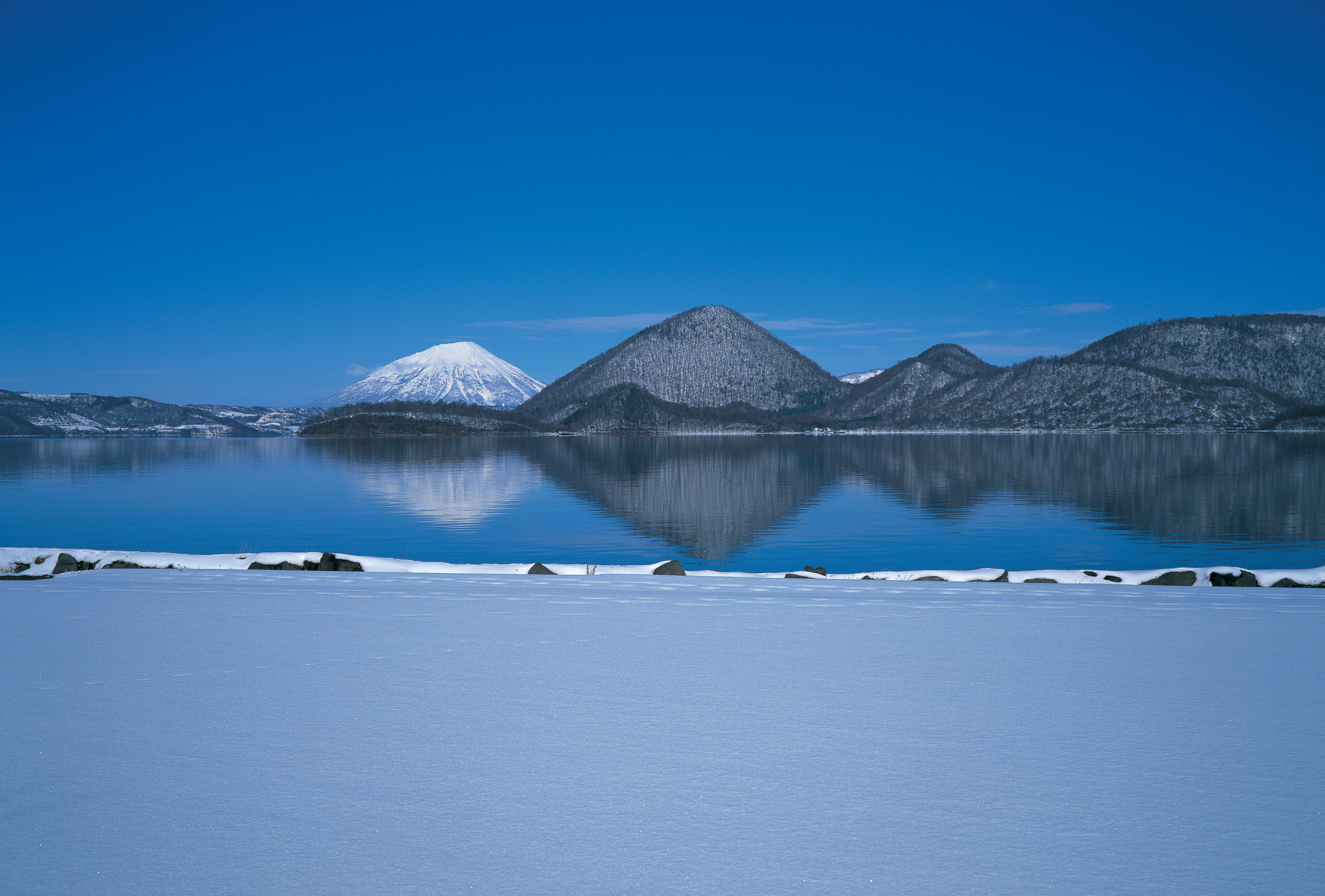
Lake Toya in winter

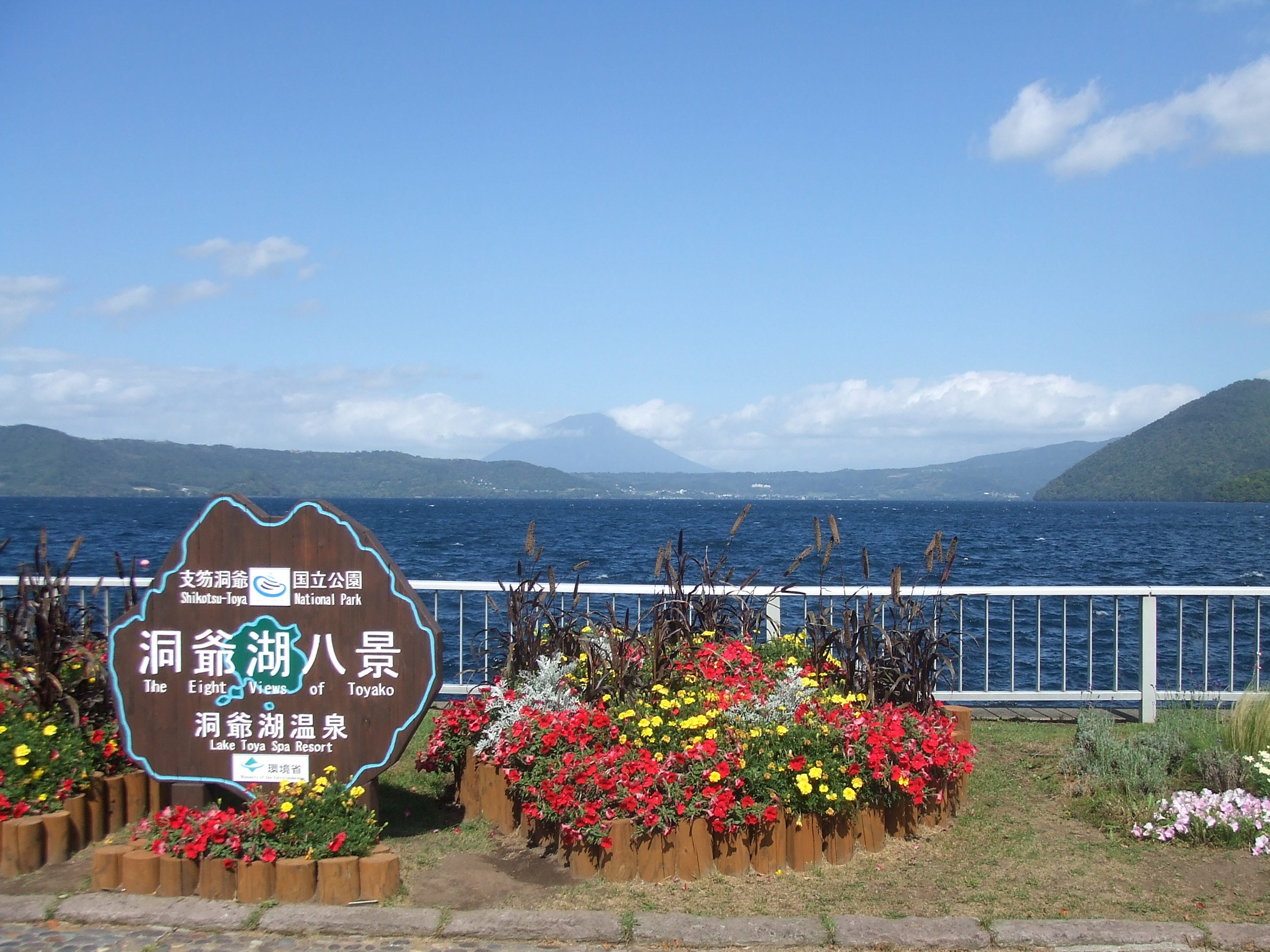
View from near Toyako Onsen (September 2008)

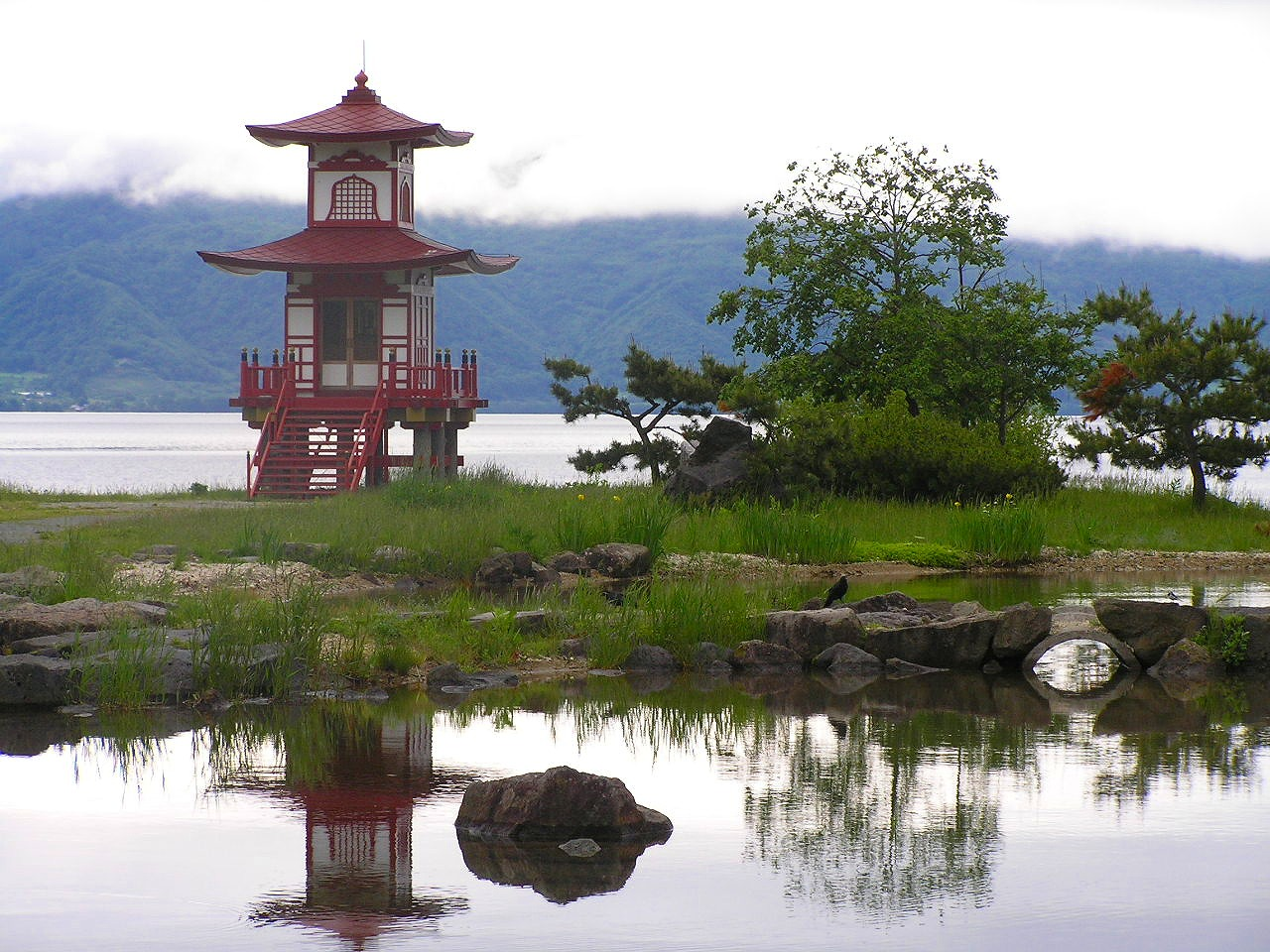
Ukimido Park on the northern shore of the lake (June 2006)

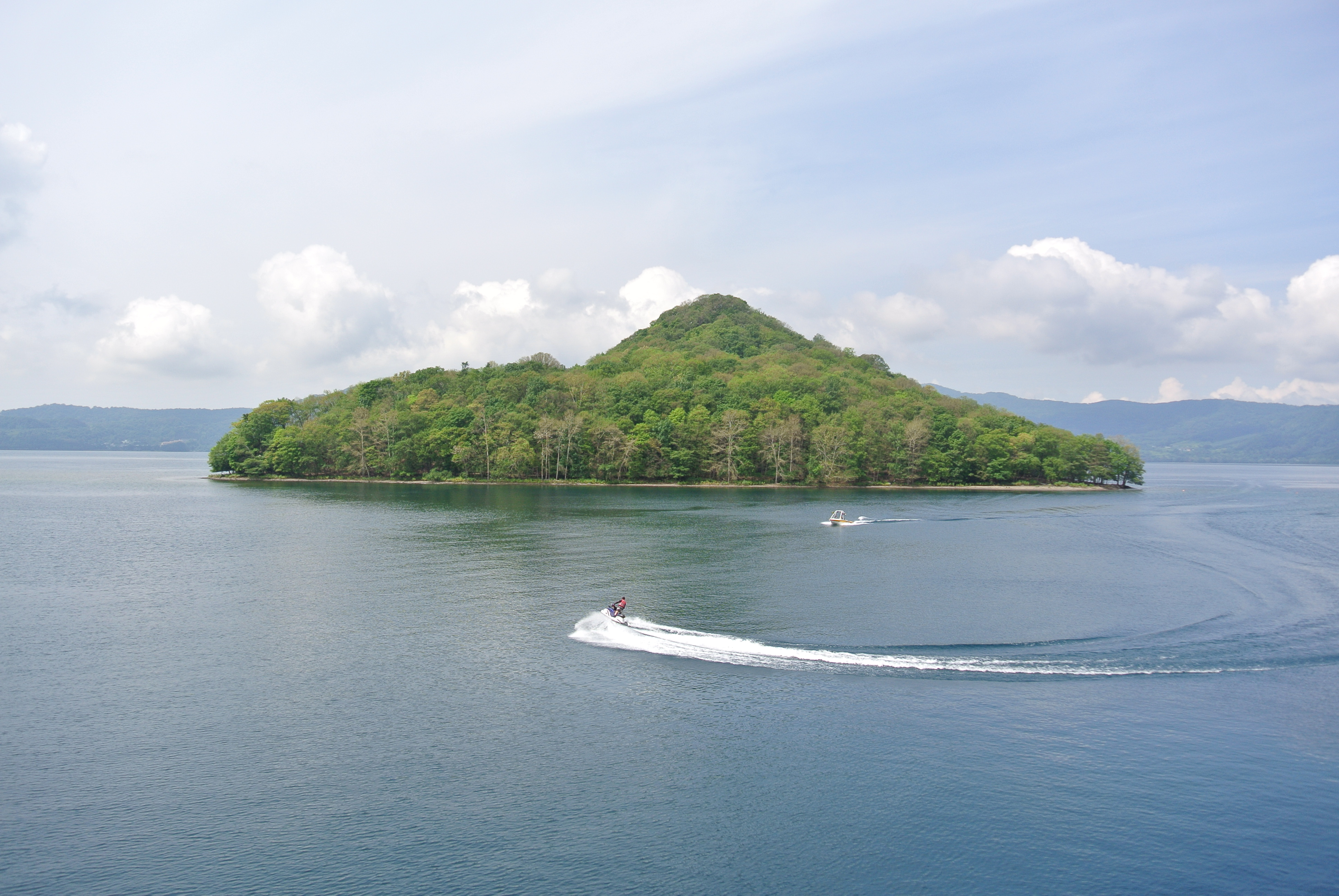
Lake Toya and Nakajima (August 2014)

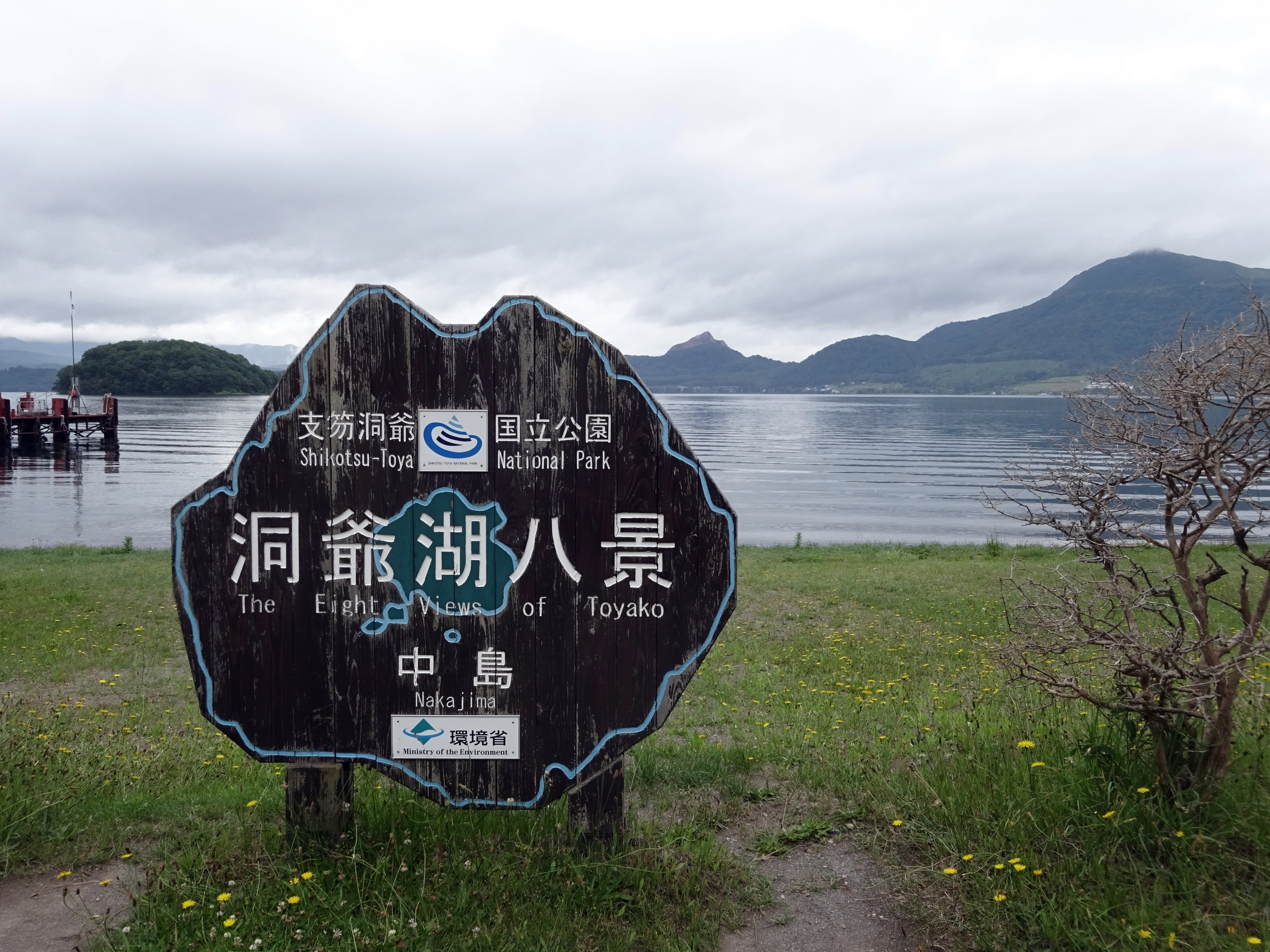
Monument located on Oshima (Nakajima) in Lake Toya (June 2022)

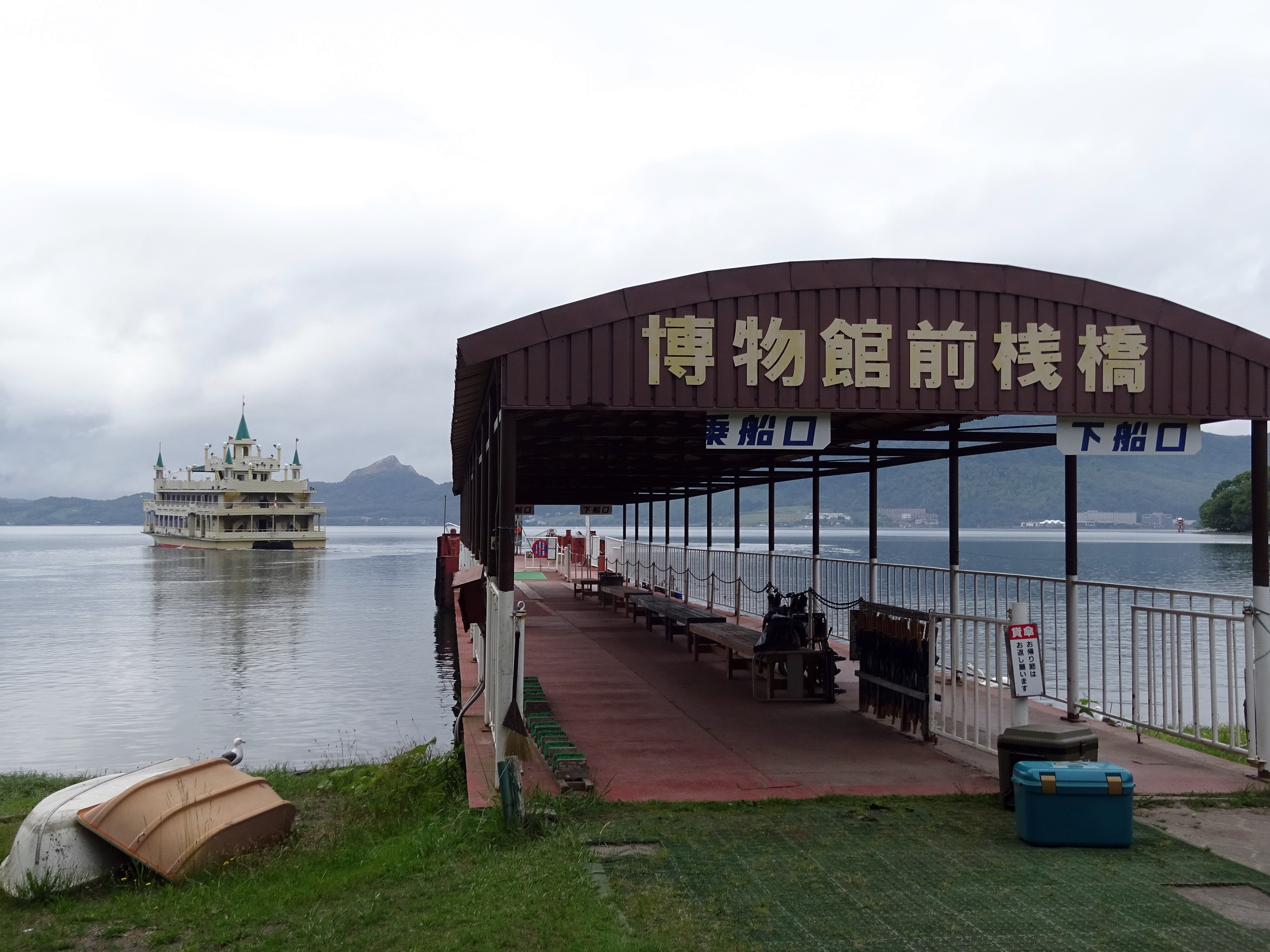
Pier in front of the museum (June 2022)

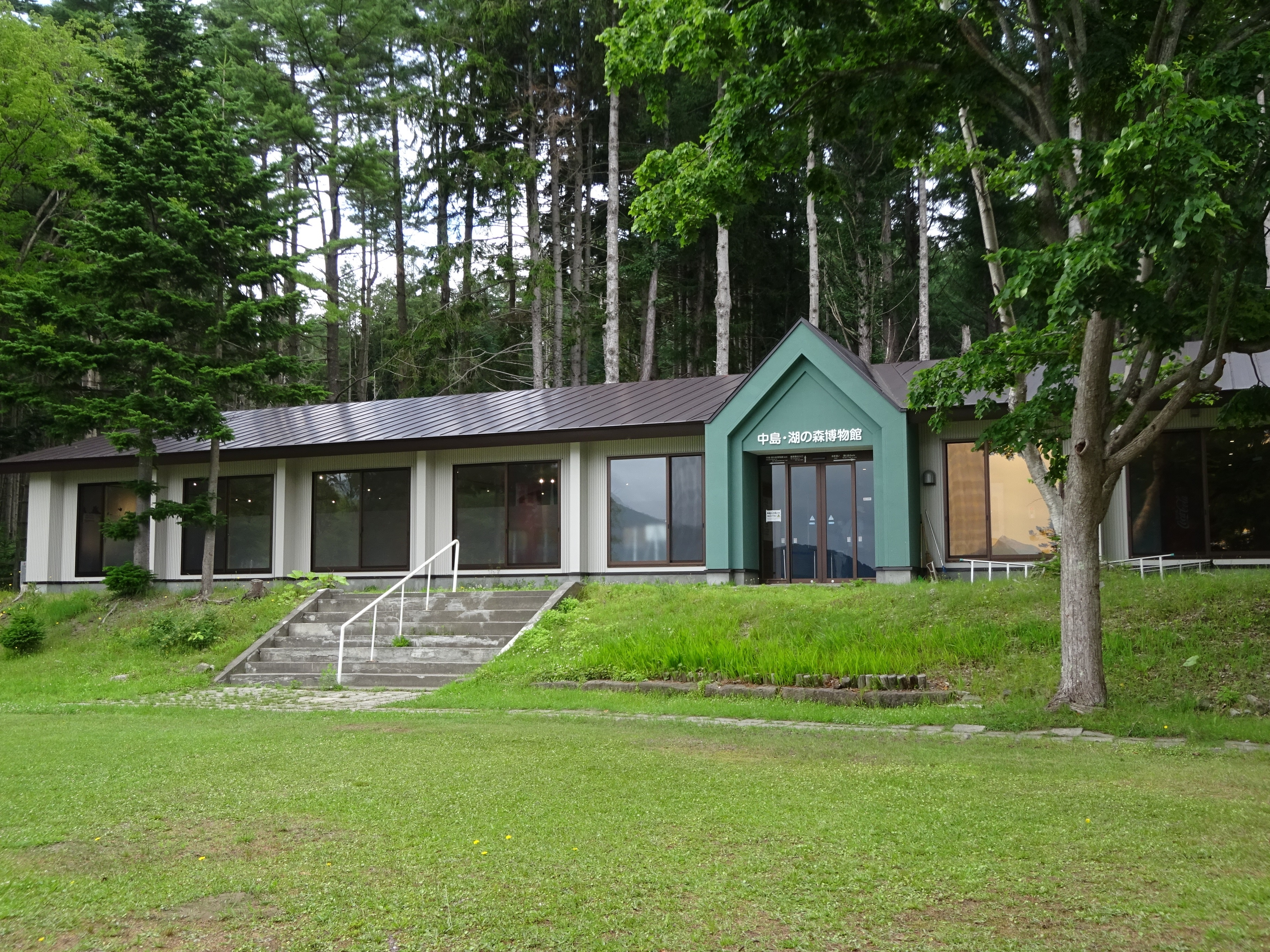
Nakajima Lake Forest Museum (June 2022)

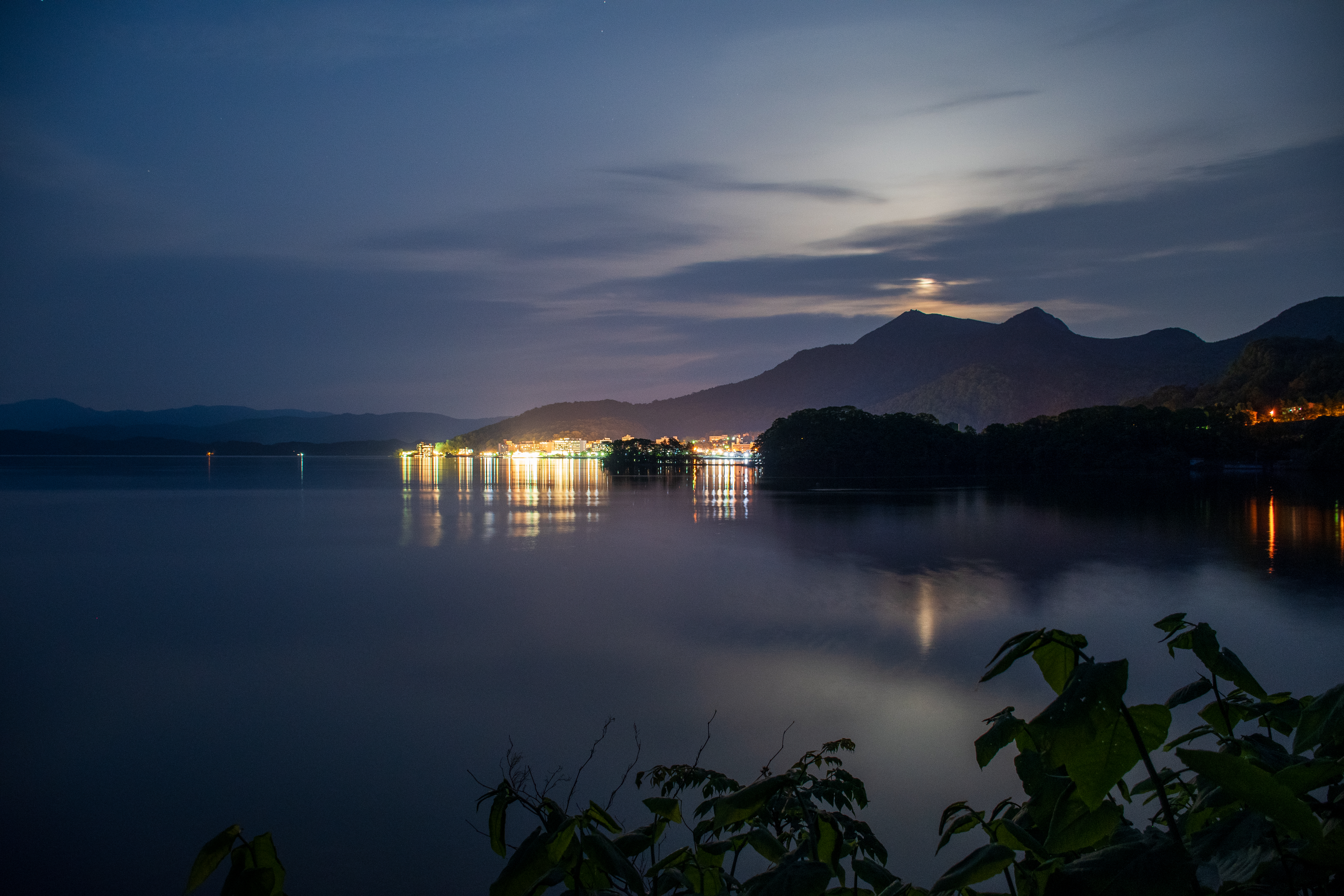
View of the southern shore at night

== In popular culture ==
- The setting of the 2012 film Bread of Happiness is on the shores of the lake.
- In the manga and anime Gintama, Lake Tōya (洞爺湖 Tōya-ko) is engraved on the Bokutō of the main character Gintoki Sakata (坂田 銀時, Sakata Gintoki).
- It is the model for Lake Kiriya in the anime Celestial Method.
- Lake Verity in Pokémon Diamond and Pearl, Pokémon Platinum, Pokémon Brilliant Diamond and Shining Pearl and Pokémon Legends: Arceus is based on this lake as the Sinnoh and Hisui regions is a fictionalized version of Hokkaido.

== See also ==
- List of lakes in Japan
- List of volcanoes in Japan
