= Mount Izari =

Volcano in Hokkaidō, Japan

- 漁岳
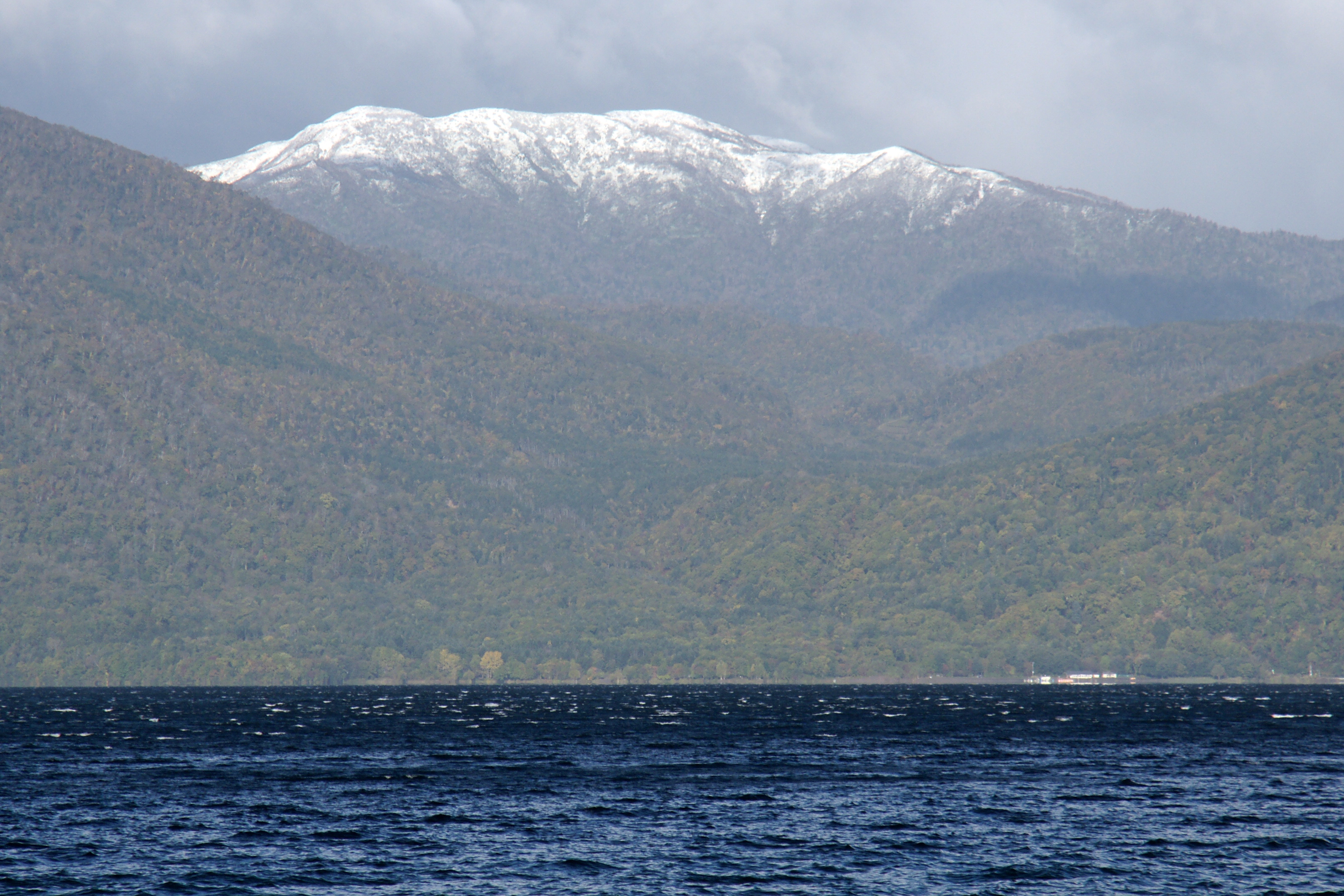
- Lake Shikotsu and Mount Izari

Highest point
- Elevation: 1,317.7 m (4,323 ft)
- Coordinates: 42°49′16″N 141°14′08″E

Naming
- English translation: fishing mountain
- Language of name: Japanese
- Pronunciation: [Izaridake]

Geography
- Location: Hokkaido, Japan

Mount Izari (漁岳, Izaridake) is a volcano with an altitude of 1,318 m at the junction of Eniwa, Chitose and Sapporo, Ishikari Subprefecture, Hokkaido. It has been selected as one of the 100 famous mountains in Hokkaido. A second-class triangulation station "Izaridake" is set up on the mountaintop.

== Etymology ==
Mount Izari is derived from the Izari River whose water source is this mountain. The etymology of "Izari" is the Ainu word for "Ichankoppesan," which means "river spawning salmon and trout." There is a mountain of the same name "Ichankoppesan" nearby.
