= Chitose River =

River in Hokkaidō, Japan

Chitose River 千歳川
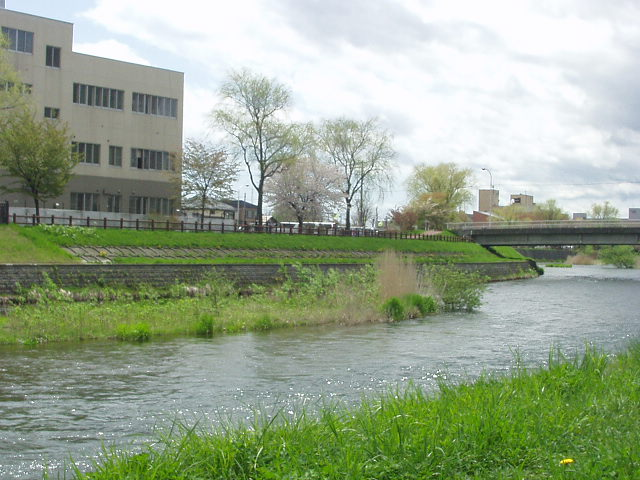
- View from the southern bank on Chūō Grand Avenue in Chitose, Japan (May 2004)

- Location within Japan
- Native name: Chitose-gawa (Japanese)

Location
- Country: Japan
- State: Hokkaidō
- Region: Ishikari Subprefecture, Sorachi Subprefecture
- District: Sorachi District, Kabato District
- Municipalities: Nanporo, Chitose, Ebetsu, Kitahiroshima, Eniwa, Naganuma

Physical characteristics
- Source: Lake Shikotsu
  - location: Chitose, Hokkaidō, Japan
  - coordinates: 42°46′16″N 141°24′11″E
  - elevation: 248 m (814 ft)
- Mouth: Ishikari River
  - location: Ebetsu, Hokkaidō, Japan
  - coordinates: 43°07′05″N 141°33′24″E
  - elevation: 3 m (9.8 ft)
- Length: 108 km (67 mi)
- Basin size: 1,244 km^{2} (480 sq mi)

Basin features
- Tributaries
  - left: Horomuiunga (幌向運河, Horomuiunga), Kyūyūbari River (旧夕張川, Kyūyūbari-gawa), South Number 6 River (南六号川, Minami-Roku-Gou-gawa), Kenefuchi River (嶮淵川, Kenefuchi-gawa), University Drainage (大学排水, Daigaku Haisu), Shukubai River (祝梅川, Shukubai-gawa), Mamachi River
  - right: Sanaebetsu River (早苗別川, Sanaebetsu-gawa), Sanaebetsu River Canal, Tomasubetsu River (登満別川, Tomasubetsu-gawa), Shimonbetsu River (志文別川, Shimonbetsu-gawa), Ura No Sawa River (裏no沢川, Ura no Sawa-gawa), Wattsu River (輪厚川, Wattsu-gawa), Shimamatsu River (島松川, Shimamatsu-gawa), Izari River (漁川, Izari-gawa), Osatsu River (長都川, Osatsu-gawa), Naibetsu River (内別川, Naibetsu-gawa), Yuunai River, Monbetsu River (紋別川, Mombetsu-gawa)

Chitose River (千歳川, Chitose-gawa) is a river in Hokkaidō, Japan. The river is a class A river. In the city of Ebetsu, the river is sometimes known as Ebetsu River (江別川, Ebetsu-gawa).

In the Ainu language Chitose was originally called shikot, meaning big depression or hollow, like Lake Shikotsu a caldera lake. To the Japanese, this sounded too much like dead bones (死骨, shikotsu), so it was changed to Chitose. The name of the river was changed in 1805.

== Course ==
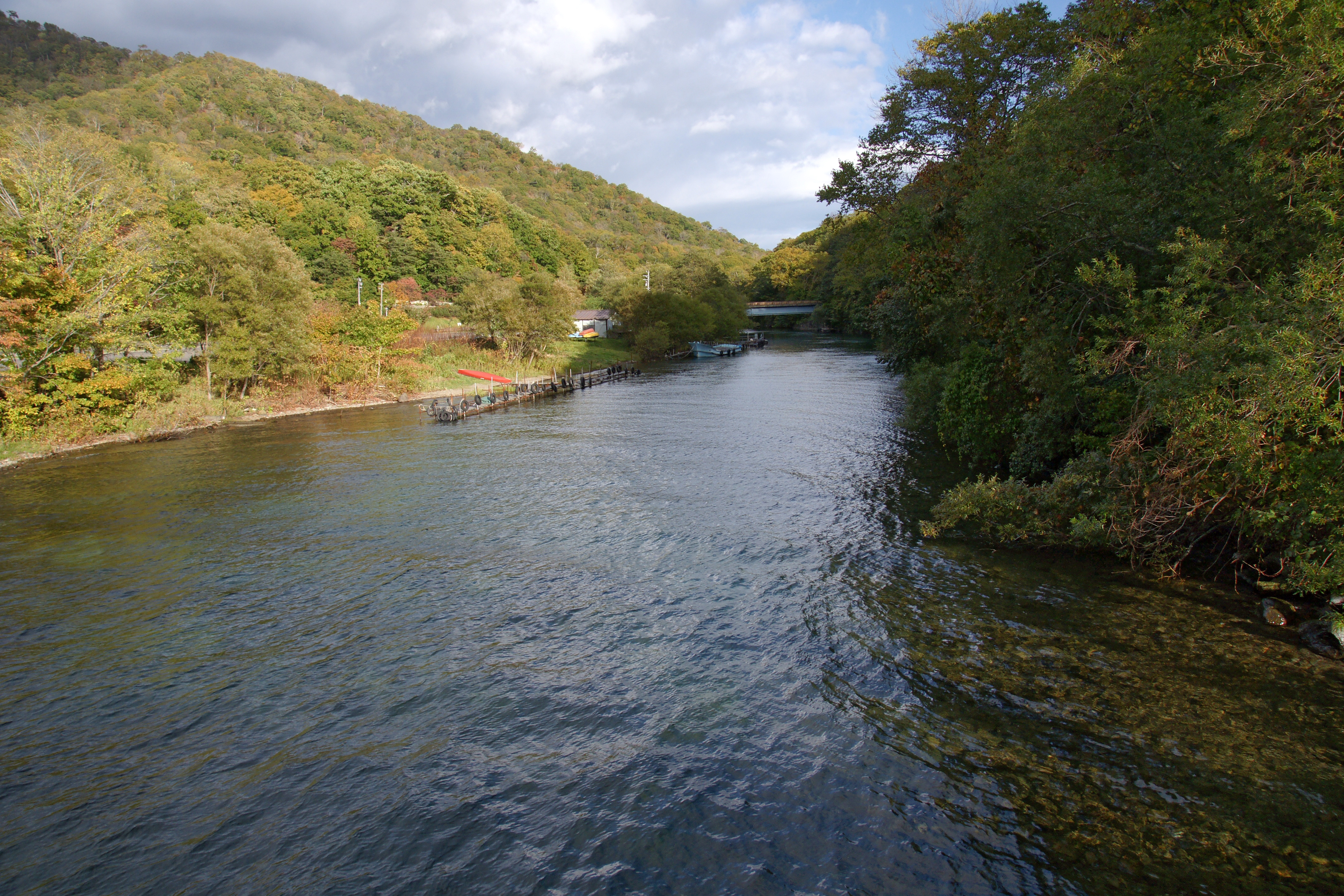
Chitose river lake Shikotsu

The Chitose River is the outflow of Lake Shikotsu. From the lake the river flows through a series of power plants owned by the Oji Paper Company. The Chitose River flows through the center of the city of Chitose, before entering the Ishikari Plain. On the plain, the river feeds and is fed by numerous irrigation canals. Here the Chitose River forms part of the border between Ishikari and Sorachi Subprefectures. Finally, the river passes through the city of Ebetsu before it flows into the Ishikari River.

== Flooding ==
The Chitose River causes flooding damage about every two years, widening to as many as 40 kilometres (25 mi). The last major flood was in 1981, where the river flooded 2700 homes and 20,000 hectares (77 mi^{2}) of land. National, prefectural, and local governments have been adopting numerous measures to try to reduce the severity of the flooding.
