= Lake Shikotsu =

Caldera lake on the island of Hokkaido in Japan

Lake Shikotsu 支笏湖
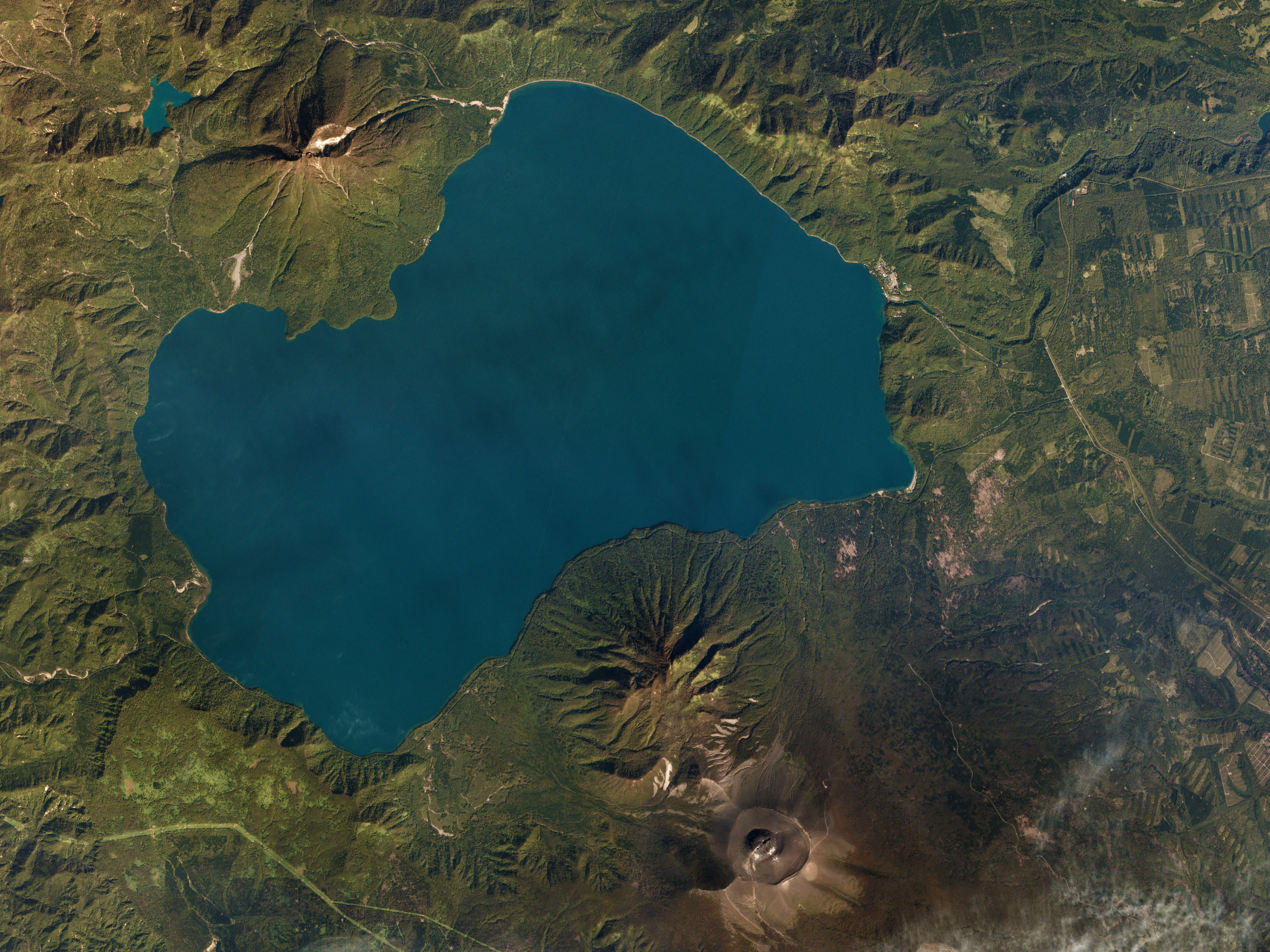

- Location within Japan
- Coordinates: 42°48′N 141°21′E
- Type: crater lake
- Primary inflows: Bifue, Okotanpe, Ninaru, Furenai
- Primary outflows: Chitose
- Catchment area: 223 km^{2} (86 sq mi)
- Basin countries: Japan
- Surface area: 78.4 km^{2} (30.3 sq mi)
- Average depth: 265.4 metres (870.7 ft)
- Max. depth: 363 metres (1,191 ft)
- Water volume: 20.81 km^{3} (4.99 cu mi)
- Shore length^{1}: 40.4 kilometres (25.1 mi)
- Surface elevation: 247 metres (810 ft)
- Islands: 0
- ^{1} Shore length is not a well-defined measure.

Lake Shikotsu (支笏湖, Shikotsu-ko) is a caldera lake in Chitose, Hokkaidō, Japan. It is a part of the Shikotsu-Toya National Park.

== Geography ==
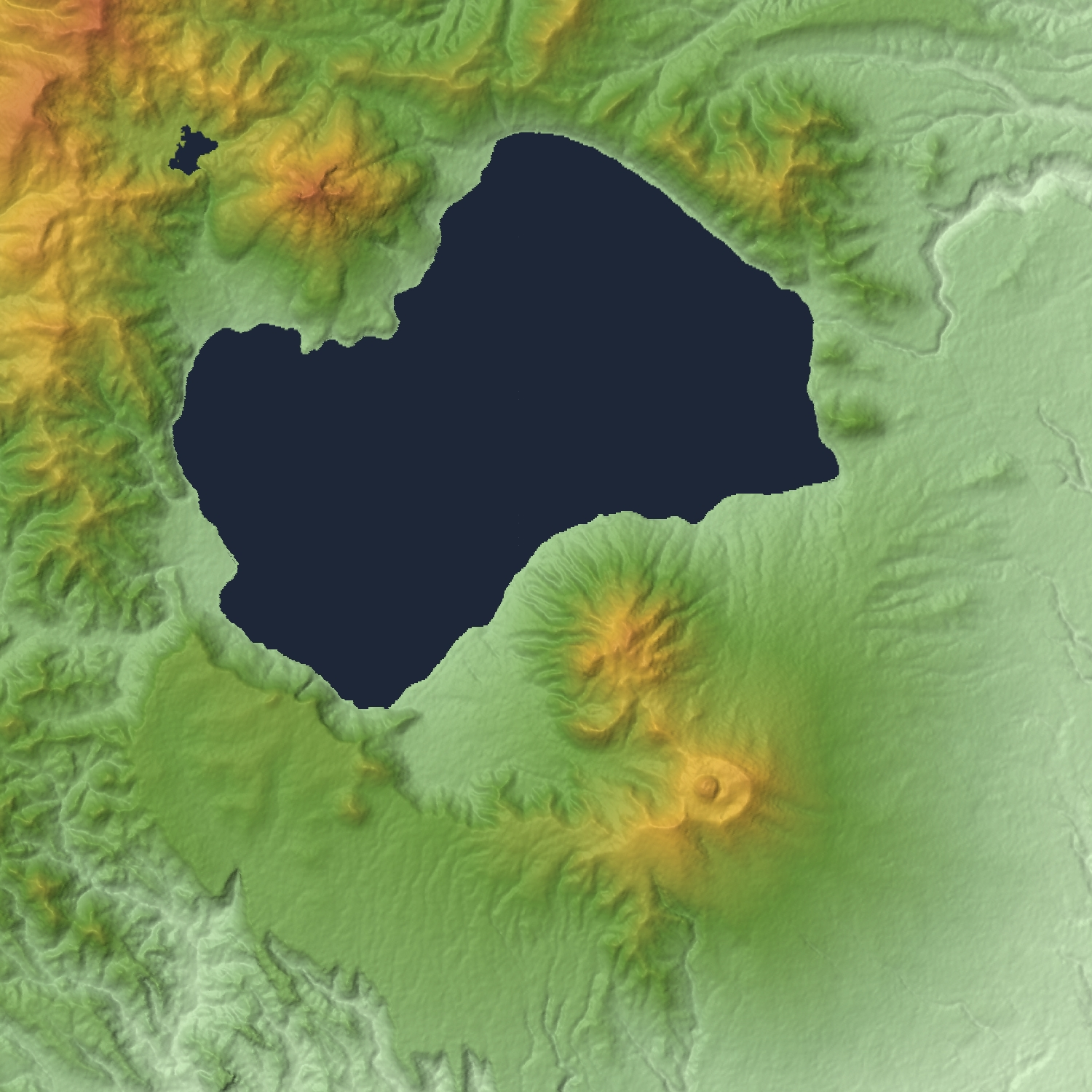
Topographic maps of Shikotsu Caldera Mount Eniwa (top left) Mount Tarumae (bottom right)

Lake Shikotsu is located in the south-west part of Hokkaidō. It has an average depth of 265 metres (869 ft) and a maximum depth of 363 metres (1,191 ft), making it the second deepest lake in Japan, after Lake Tazawa. It is the 8th-largest lake by surface area in Japan and the second largest of Japan's caldera lakes, surpassed only by Lake Kussharo. It is surrounded by five volcanoes: Mount Eniwa and Mount Izari to the north and Mount Fuppushi, Mount Tarumae, and Kitayama to the south. The caldera formed in the holocene when the land between the volcanoes subsided.

Due to its depth, the volume of Lake Shikotsu reaches 3/4 of the volume of Lake Biwa, Japan's largest lake, despite having only 1/9 of that lake's surface area. Due to the small surface area to depth ratio, the water temperature remains quite constant throughout the year, making it the northernmost ice-free lake in Japan. The Bifue, Okotanpe, Ninaru and Furenai rivers feed into it, and its main outlet is the Chitose River.

=== Climate ===
Climate data for Lake Shikotsu (1991−2020 normals, extremes 1977−present)
Month	Jan	Feb	Mar	Apr	May	Jun	Jul	Aug	Sep	Oct	Nov	Dec	Year
Record high °C (°F)	6.2 (43.2)	9.4 (48.9)	13.8 (56.8)	22.9 (73.2)	29.7 (85.5)	30.0 (86.0)	31.8 (89.2)	31.9 (89.4)	29.1 (84.4)	23.6 (74.5)	18.6 (65.5)	12.5 (54.5)	31.9 (89.4)
Mean daily maximum °C (°F)	−1.9 (28.6)	−1.2 (29.8)	2.4 (36.3)	8.7 (47.7)	15.2 (59.4)	18.7 (65.7)	22.0 (71.6)	23.2 (73.8)	20.0 (68.0)	14.2 (57.6)	7.0 (44.6)	0.4 (32.7)	10.7 (51.3)
Daily mean °C (°F)	−4.8 (23.4)	−4.5 (23.9)	−1.0 (30.2)	4.4 (39.9)	9.9 (49.8)	14.0 (57.2)	18.0 (64.4)	19.4 (66.9)	16.1 (61.0)	10.2 (50.4)	3.5 (38.3)	−2.5 (27.5)	6.9 (44.4)
Mean daily minimum °C (°F)	−7.9 (17.8)	−7.9 (17.8)	−4.4 (24.1)	0.6 (33.1)	5.6 (42.1)	10.4 (50.7)	15.1 (59.2)	16.6 (61.9)	12.9 (55.2)	6.6 (43.9)	0.2 (32.4)	−5.4 (22.3)	3.5 (38.4)
Record low °C (°F)	−15.9 (3.4)	−18.2 (−0.8)	−15.8 (3.6)	−6.9 (19.6)	−1.7 (28.9)	2.1 (35.8)	7.7 (45.9)	8.7 (47.7)	3.8 (38.8)	−2.6 (27.3)	−10.5 (13.1)	−15.4 (4.3)	−18.2 (−0.8)
Average precipitation mm (inches)	89.4 (3.52)	72.2 (2.84)	93.8 (3.69)	103.0 (4.06)	143.9 (5.67)	138.0 (5.43)	163.8 (6.45)	216.9 (8.54)	262.0 (10.31)	193.8 (7.63)	137.4 (5.41)	97.3 (3.83)	1,711.3 (67.37)
Average rainy days	10.4	10.4	12.2	10.4	10.7	9.7	10.8	12.3	13.4	12.2	12.0	10.5	135
Mean monthly sunshine hours	117.9	116.6	148.5	179.3	185.3	149.0	123.3	132.0	148.6	152.3	112.1	103.6	1,668.6
Source 1: JMA
Source 2: JMA

== Geology ==
The caldera on which Lake Shikotsu sits was formed 40 to 50 thousand years ago. According to the Global Volcanism Program, the caldera was formed 31 to 34 thousand years ago by one of Hokkaidō's largest quaternary eruptions. The caldera consists mainly of dacite, rhyolite, and andesite. The volcanoes Mount Eniwa, Mount Fuppushi, Mount Izari, Kitayama, and Mount Tarumae formed on the rim of this caldera.

== Origin of the name ==
The name of Lake Shikotsu derives from the Ainu language shikot, meaning big depression or hollow. To the Japanese, this sounded too much like dead bones (死骨, shikotsu), so they attempted to rename it engi, but this name did not stick.

== Use ==
The red salmon (locally called "chippu"), introduced from Lake Akan in 1895, has become a noted product of the area and chippu fishing is now a favourite pastime in summer. A visitor centre, various campgrounds and Onsen provide facilities for tourists coming to the area.

Chitose is famous for its “Indian Fish Wheel”, a device situated in the Chitose River to collect salmon returning to spawn at Lake Shikotsu.

== Transport ==
National Highway 276 runs along the southern bank, connecting the lake with Tomakomai and Date. Highway 453 runs from the eastern and northern parts of the lake to Sapporo.

City bus routes from Chitose lead to the lake. Hokkaido Chuo Bus connect Shikotsu-ko with Chitose Station and New Chitose Airport. In the summer, there is also a bus from Sapporo Terminal. The former bus service between the lake and Tomakomai has been discontinued.

== Gallery ==
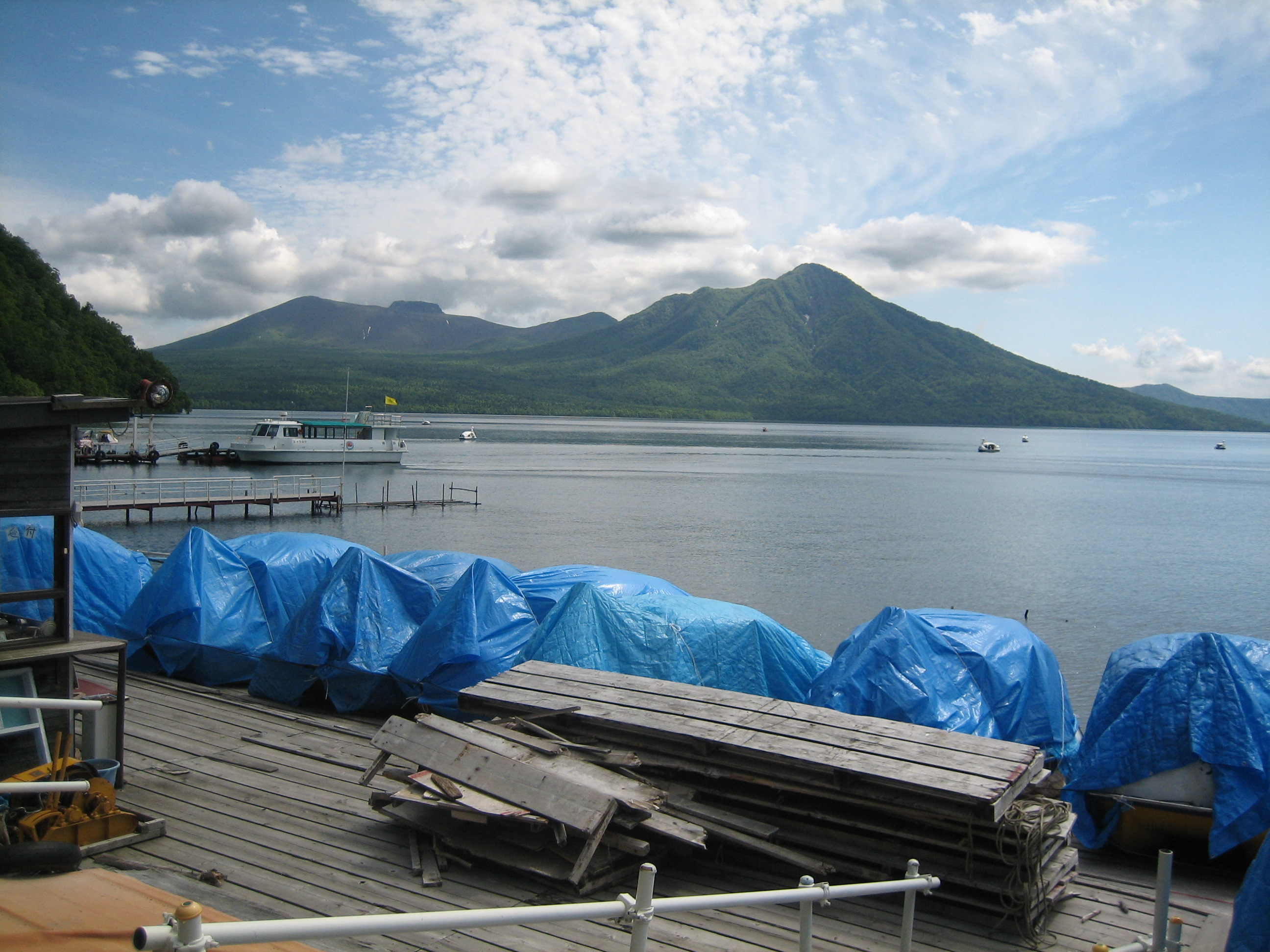
Lake Shikotsu with Mount Tarumae in the background.

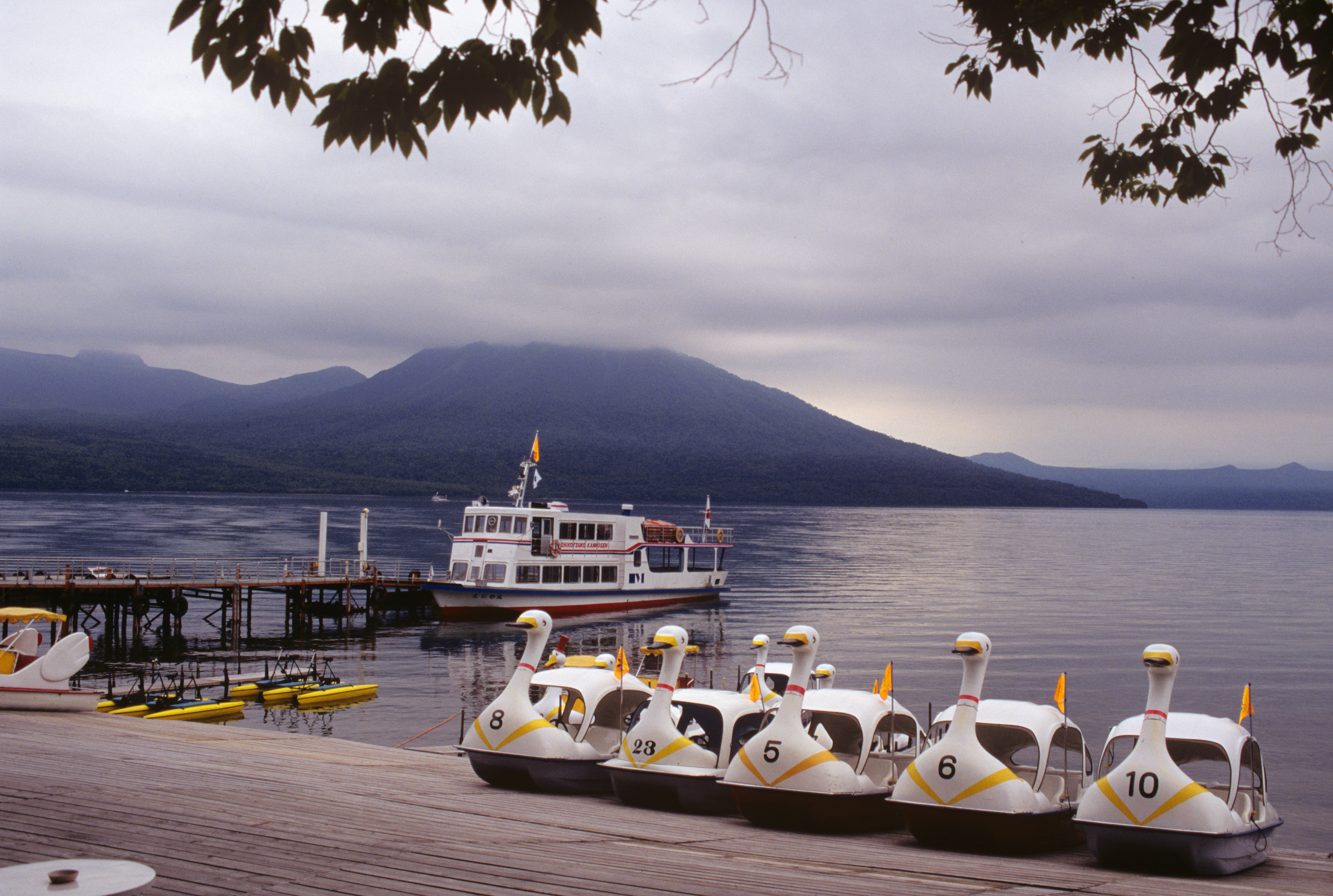
Lake Shikotsu in July 1997.

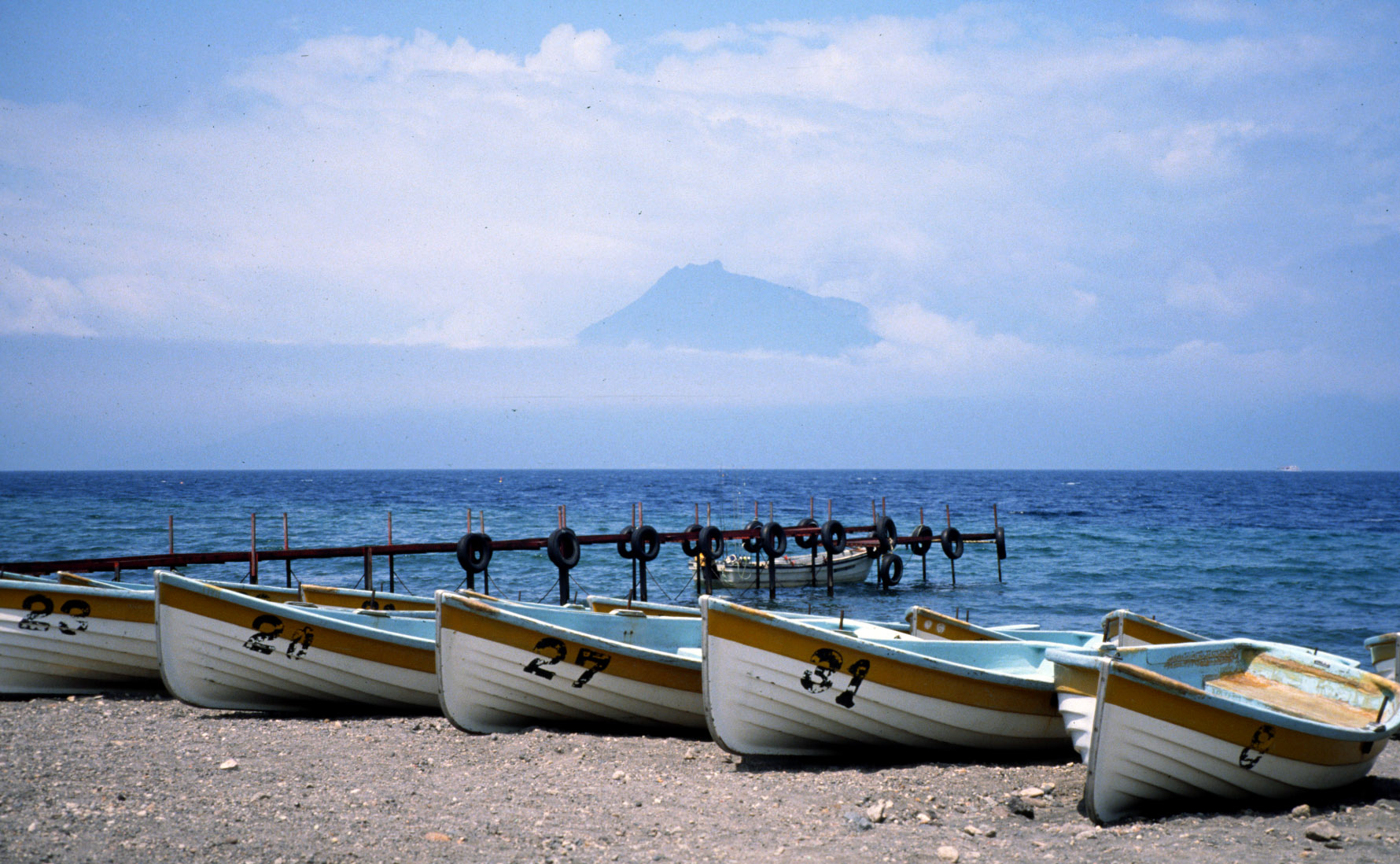
Lake Shikotsu

Several scenes from around and on the lake, 2016

== See also ==
- List of volcanoes in Japan
- List of lakes in Japan
