= Shikotsu-Tōya National Park =

National Park in Hokkaidō, Japan

- 支笏洞爺国立公園
- IUCN category II (national park)
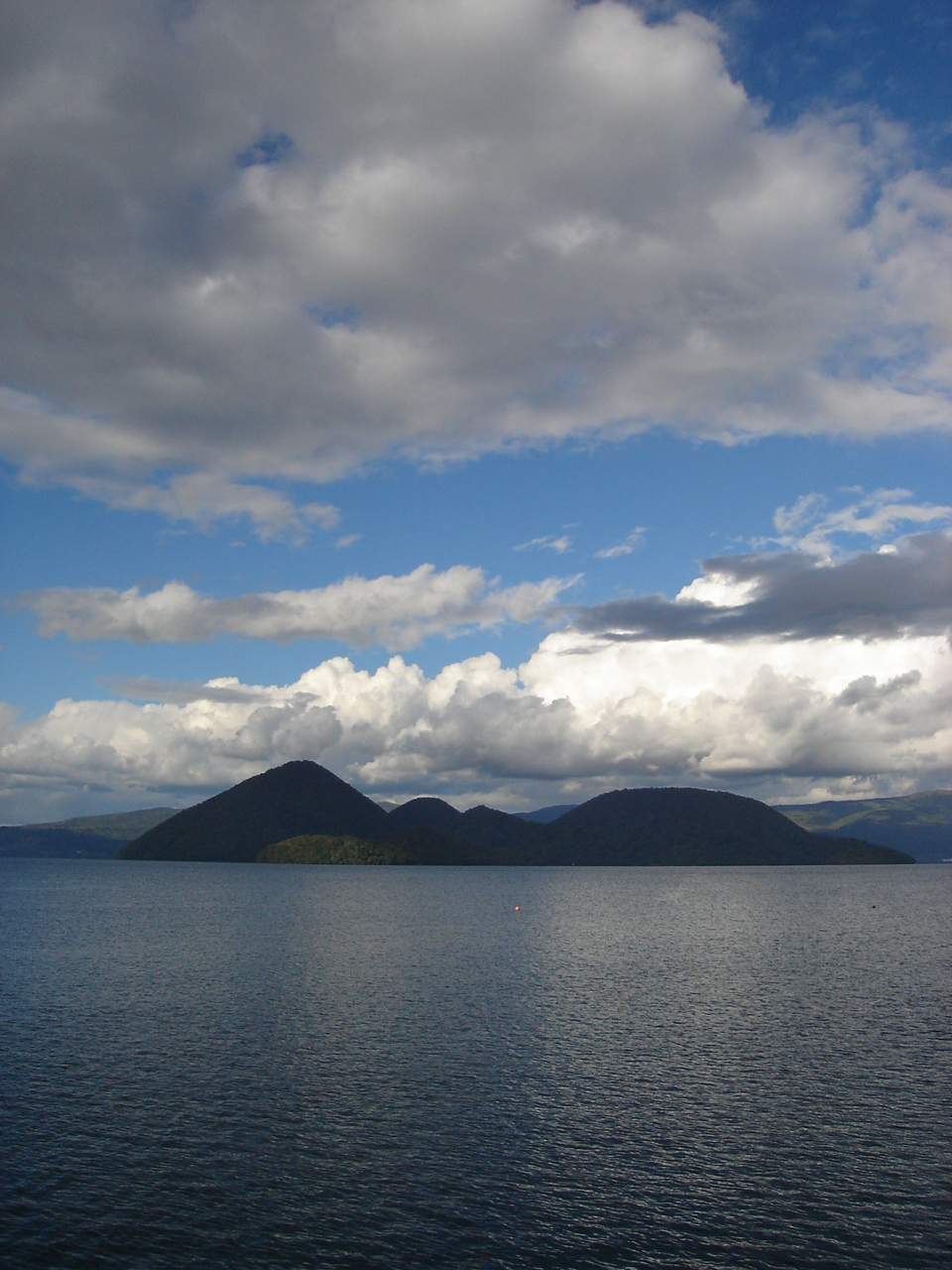
- Lake Tōya (October 2007)

- Location within Hokkaido Location within Japan
- Location: Hokkaidō, Japan
- Coordinates: 42°40′N 141°0′E
- Area: 994.73 km^{2} (384.07 sq mi)
- Established: May 16, 1949
- Governing body: Ministry of the Environment (Japan)

Shikotsu-Tōya National Park (支笏洞爺国立公園, Shikotsu Tōya Kokuritsu Kōen) is a national park in the western part of the island of Hokkaidō, Japan. Named after the volcanic caldera lakes of Lake Shikotsu and Lake Tōya, it has a total area of 993.02 square kilometres (383.41 sq mi). The popular hot spring resorts of Noboribetsu, south of the lake, and Jozankei, north of the lake, are also within the park.

== Geography ==
Shikotsu-Tōya National Park is located near Sapporo in the southwestern corner of Hokkaido.

The park can be divided into roughly three areas according to the Japanese Ministry of Environment:

- The Mount Yōtei area
- The area around caldera Lake Tōya, Mount Usu and Mount Shōwa-shinzan (Tōya Caldera and Usu Volcano Geopark), new volcanoes which had risen from the plain as a result of successive eruptions since 1944.
- The area around Lake Shikotsu (支笏湖, Shikotsu-ko) is encircled by active volcanoes such as Mount Tarumae (樽前山, Tarumae-zan) (1,041 m), and Mount Eniwa (恵庭岳, Eniwa-dake) (1,320 m ).

There is also an area around Jōzan-kei (定山渓), Hōhei Gorge (豊平峡, Hōheikyō), and Nakayama Pass (中山峠, Nakayama-tōge) and an area around the hot springs of Noboribetsu (登別), Orofure Pass (オロフレ峠, Orofure-tōge), and Lake Kuttara (倶多楽湖, Kuttara-ko) considered separate areas by others .

The nearest town is Shikotsu Kohan, a small "touristy" town with a visitor center on the lake's western shore, which can be reached by bus.

== Flora and fauna ==
The park contains mixed forests of Ezo spruce, Sakhalin fir, Mongolian oak, Japanese elm, Siberian dwarf pines and alpine plants such as Labrador tea and blue mountainheath. Animals include brown alpine hares, Hokkaido squirrels and Japanese deer, Japanese scops owl, black woodpecker, spotbill ducks and tufted ducks, as well as Yezo sika deer and Ezo red fox.

== National park installation ==
The area became a national park on May 16, 1949. It has three visitor centers: Lake Shikotsu Visitor Center, Toya Takarada Nature Experience House and Toyako Visitor Center and Volcano Science Museum.

== Travel ==
It can be reached via Chitose, Hokkaido city airport and via shinkansen from Tokyo. As of 2024, there are buses from Shin-Chitose Airport and Chitose Station to Shikotsuko Kohan.

== Image gallery ==
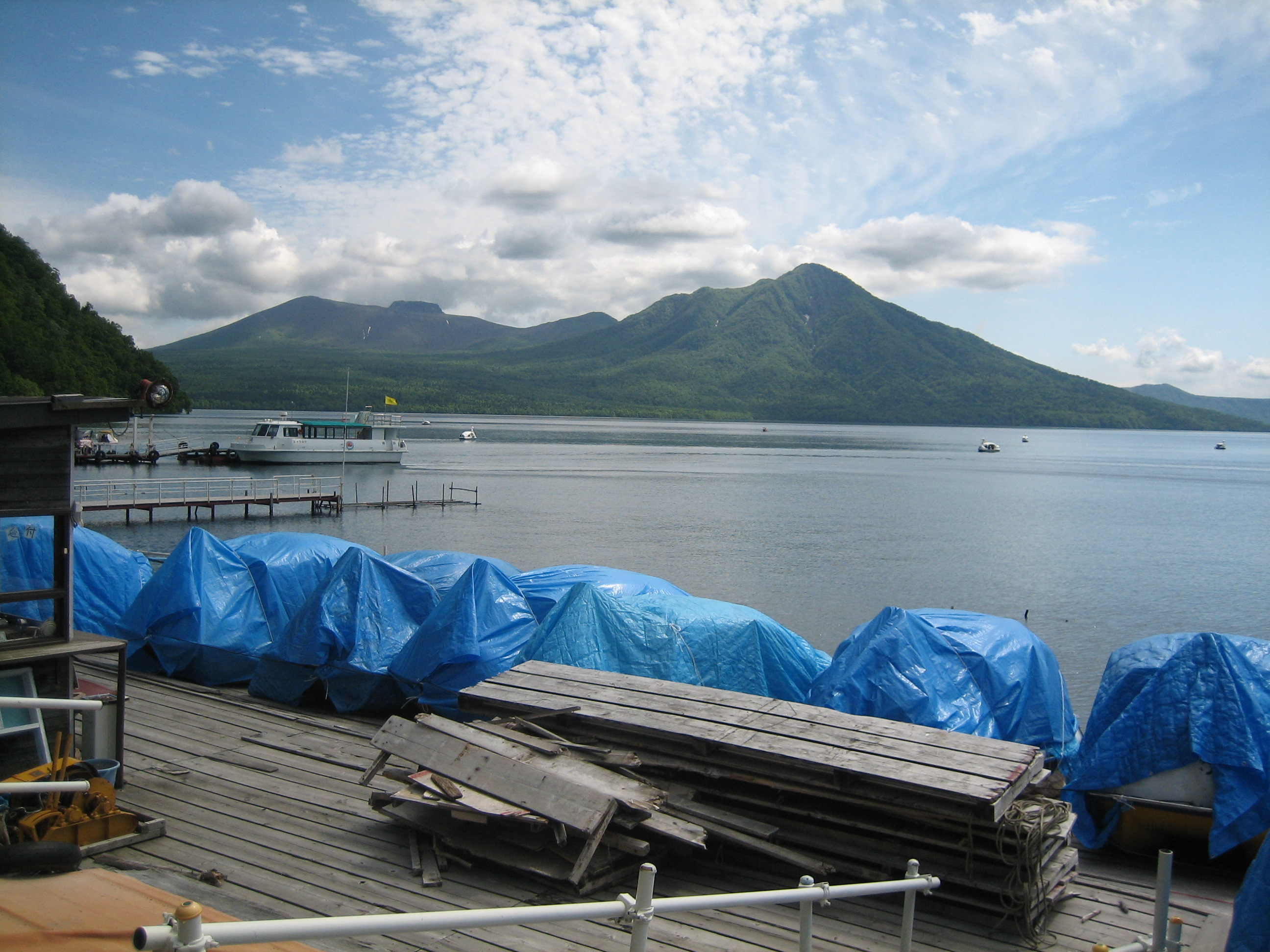
Mount Tarumae as seen from Lake Shikotsu

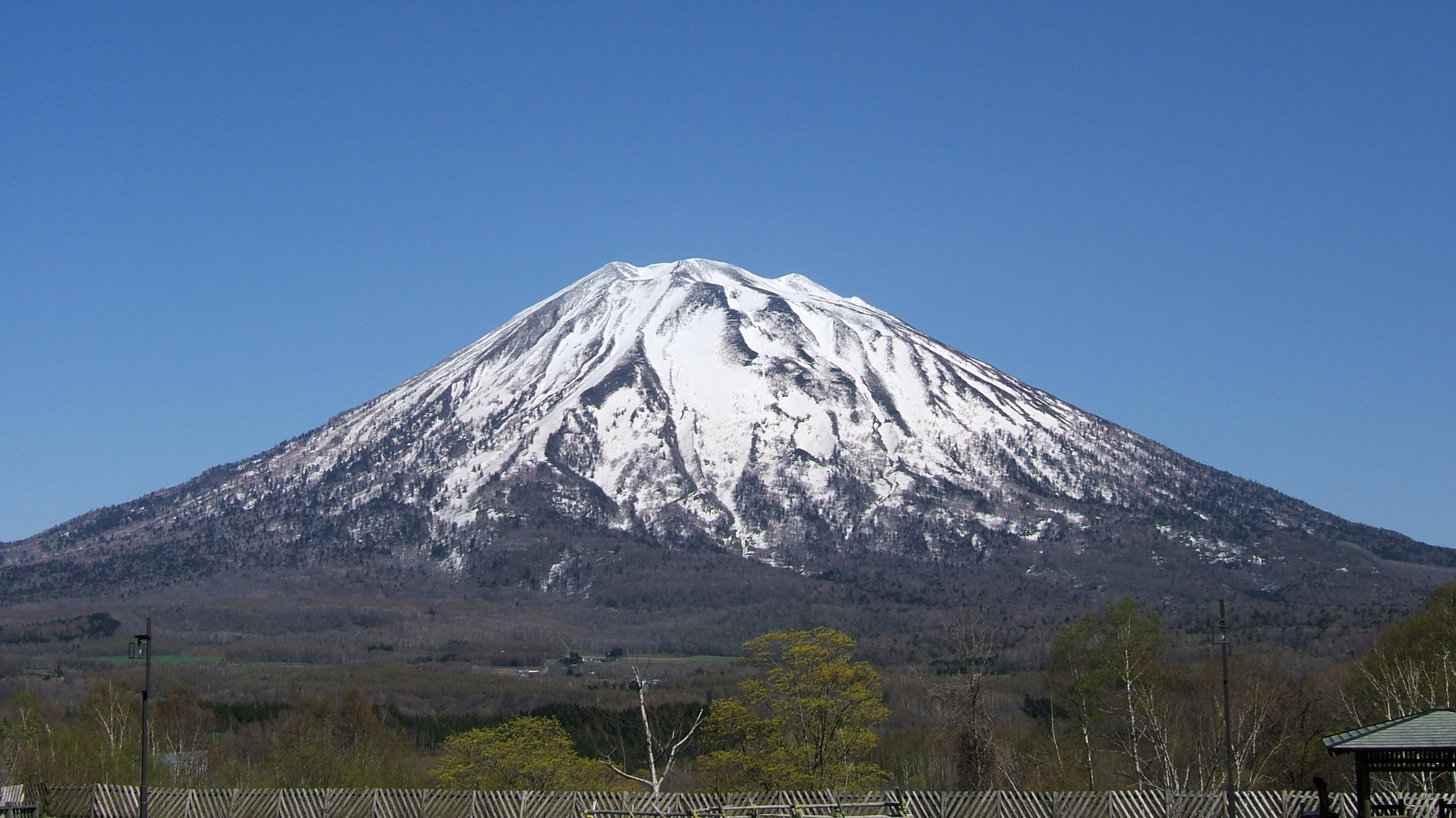
Mount Yōtei

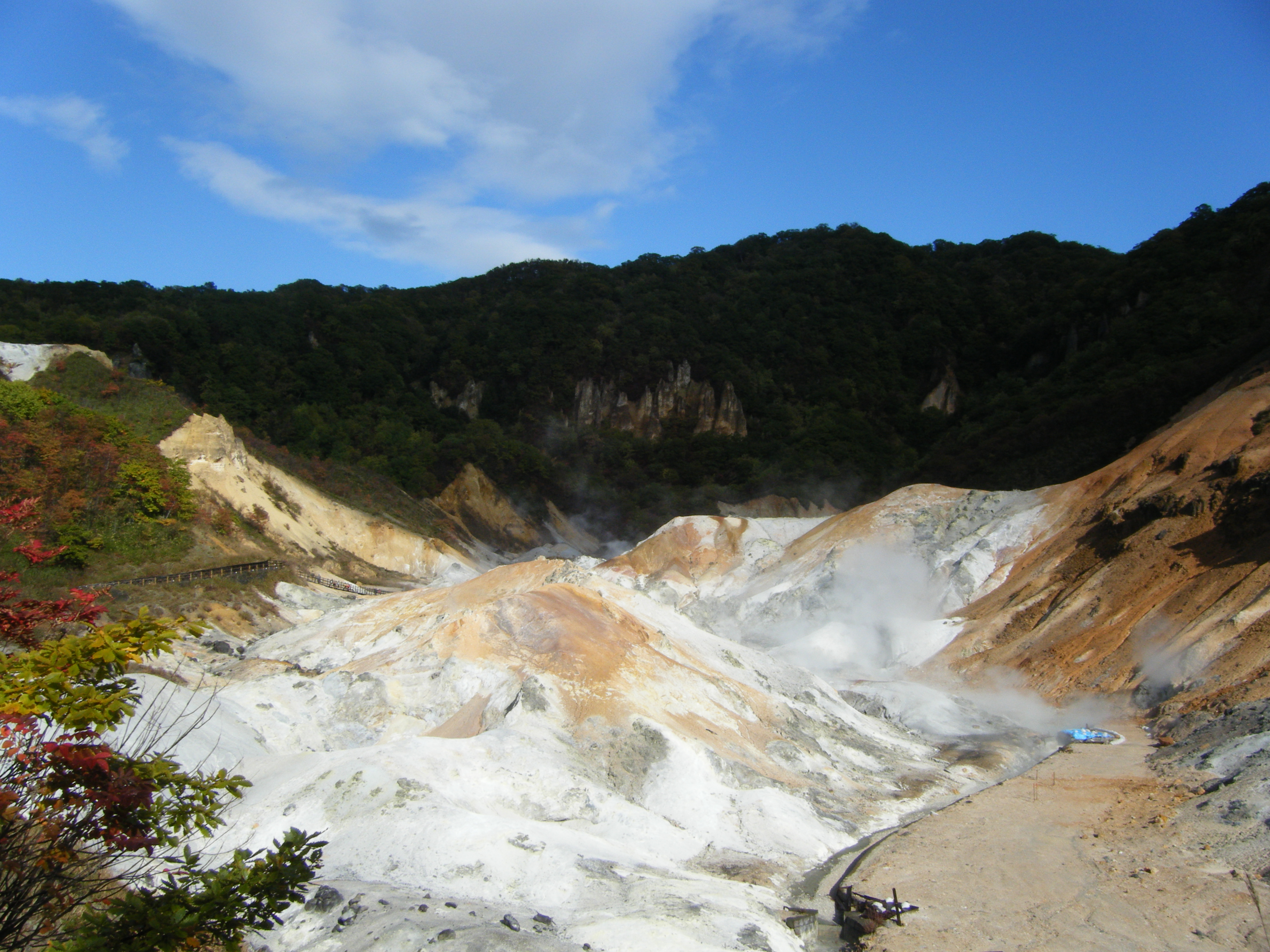
Noboribetsu hot spring

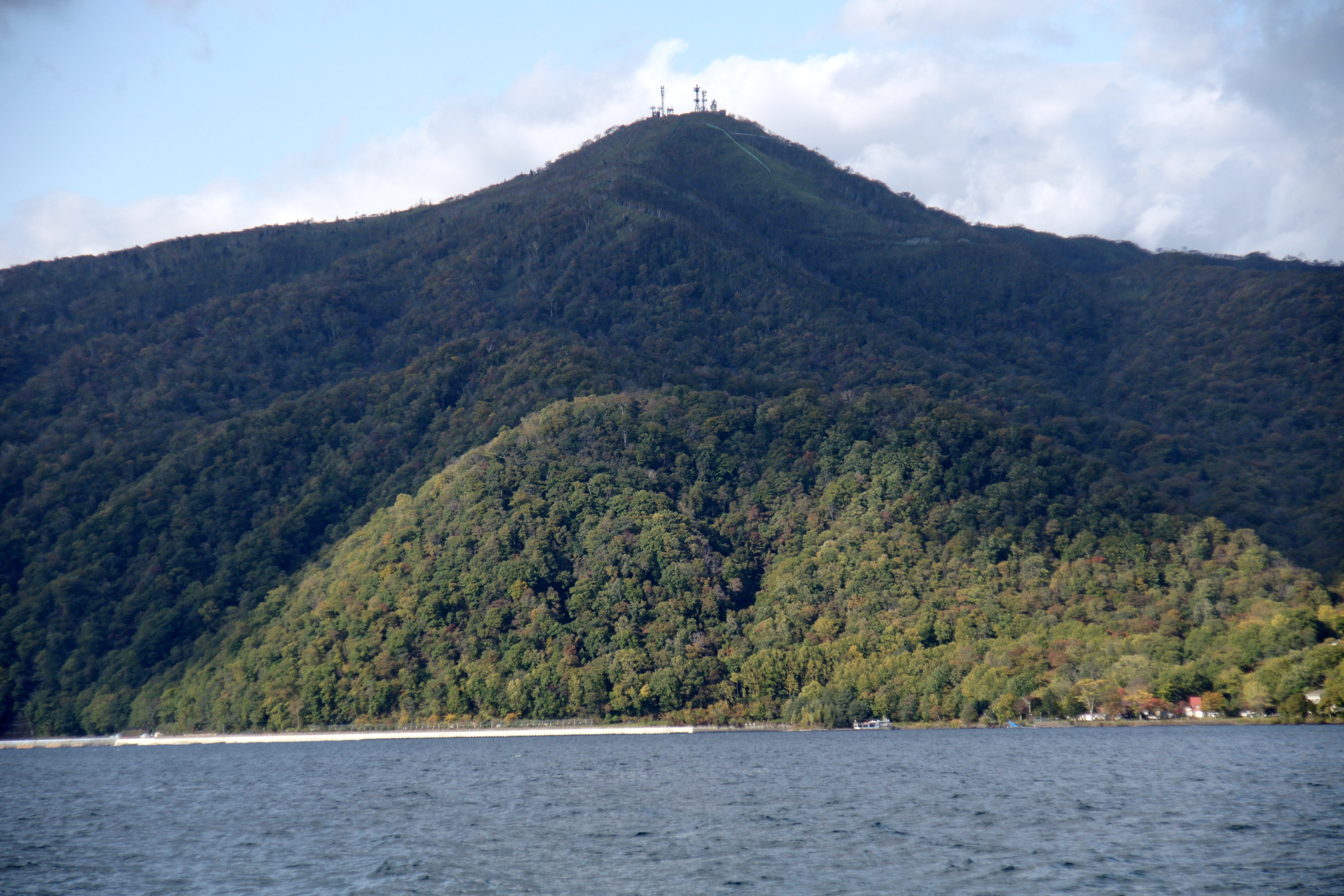
Lake Shikotsu

== See also ==
- List of national parks of Japan
