= Mount Tarumae =

Stratovolcano on the island of Hokkaido, Japan

- 樽前山
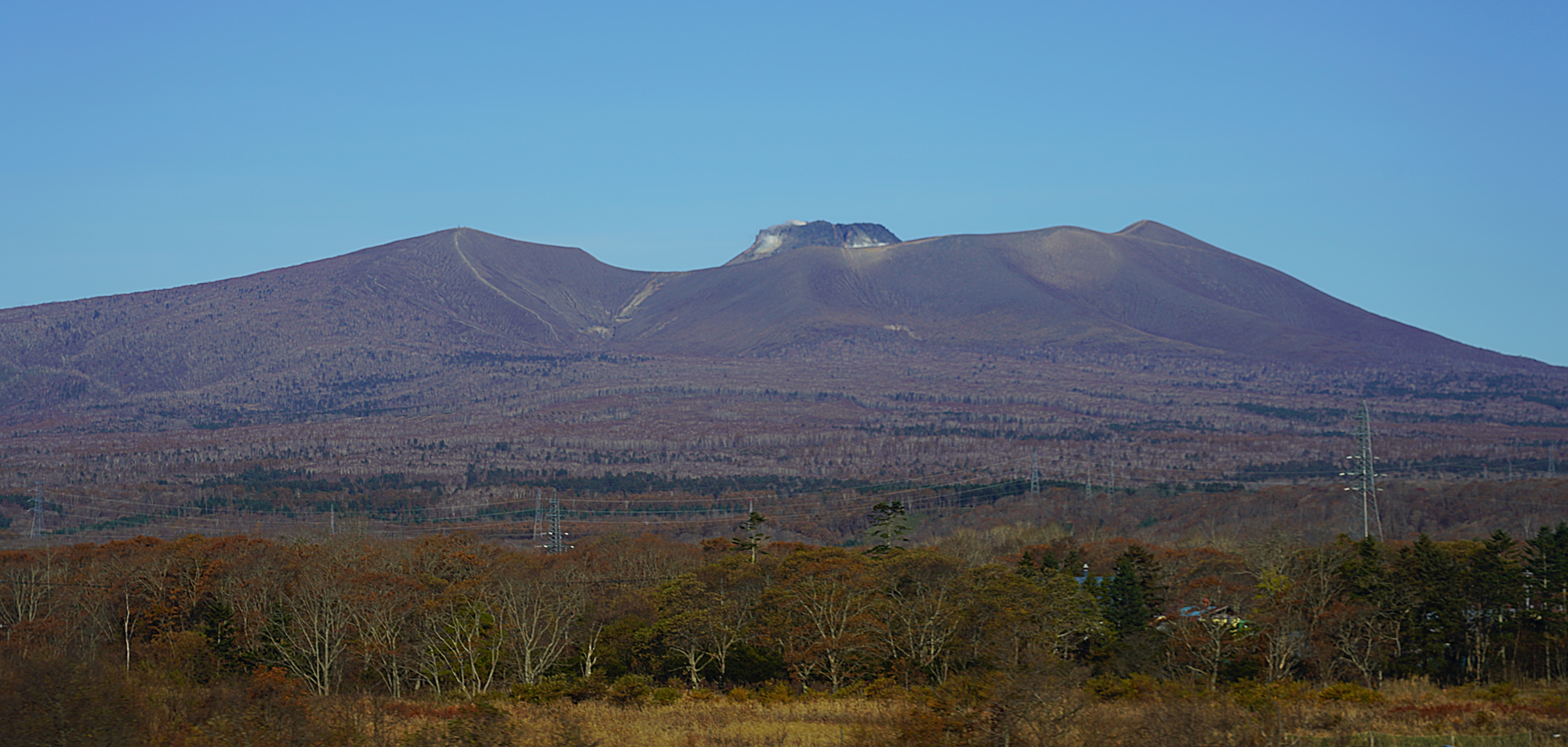
- Seen from the SSE

Highest point
- Elevation: 1,041 m (3,415 ft)
- Listing: List of mountains and hills of Japan by height List of volcanoes in Japan
- Coordinates: 42°41′24″N 141°22′41″E

Geography
- Location within Japan Location within Hokkaido
- Location: Hokkaidō, Japan
- Parent range: Nasu Volcanic Zone
- Topo map(s): Geographical Survey Institute (国土地理院, Kokudochiriin) 50000:1 樽前山, 25000:1 樽前山, 25000:1 風不死岳

Geology
- Mountain type: Caldera
- Volcanic arc: Northeastern Japan Arc
- Last eruption: 1982

Climbing
- Easiest route: Hike

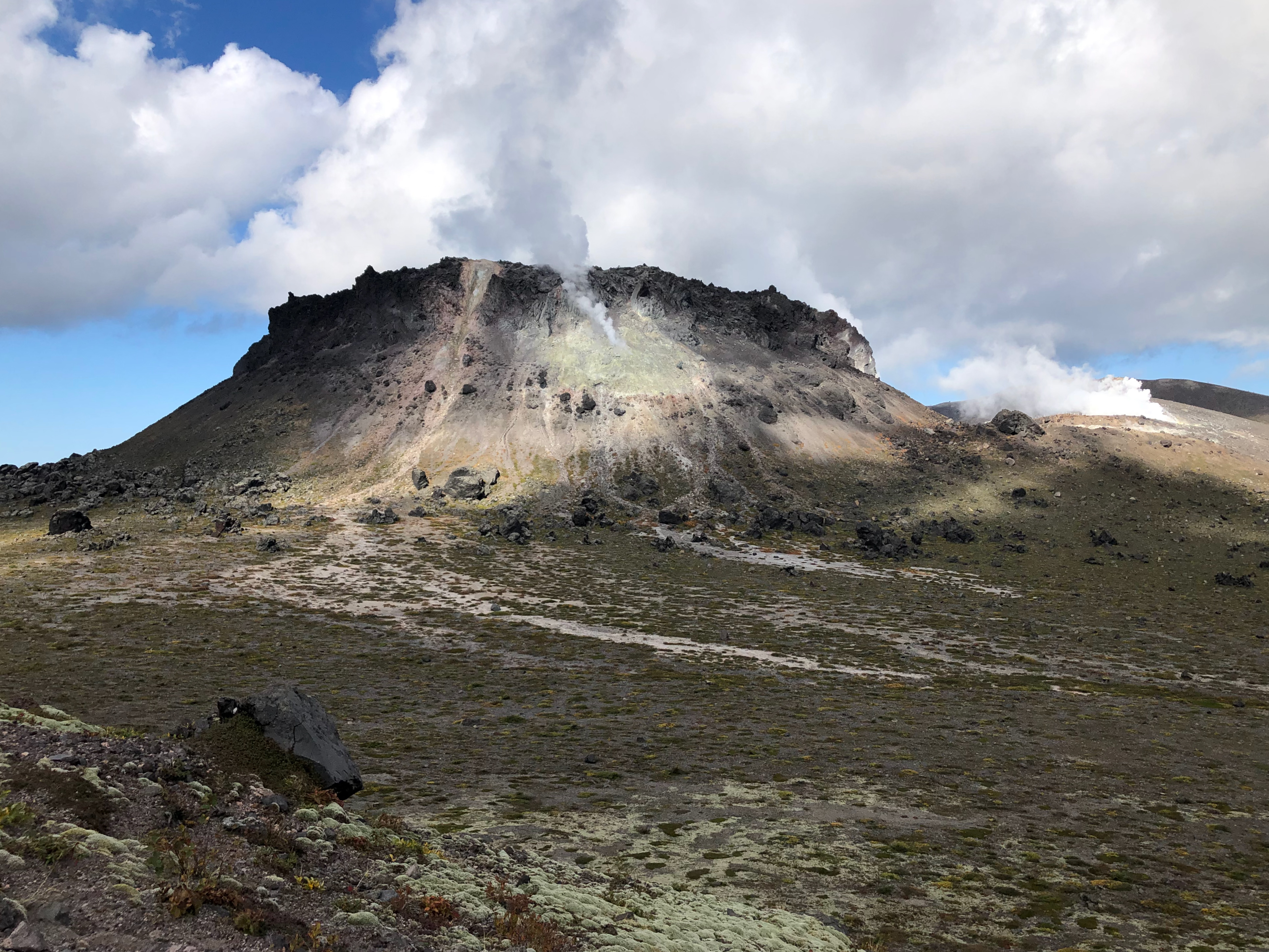
Mt. Tarumae Lava Dome and Fumaroles

Mount Tarumae (樽前山, Tarumae-zan) is located in the Shikotsu-Toya National Park in Hokkaidō, Japan. It is located near both Tomakomai and Chitose towns and can be seen clearly from both. It is on the shores of Lake Shikotsu, a caldera lake. Tarumae is a 1,041 metre active andesitic stratovolcano, with a lava dome.

== Eruptions ==
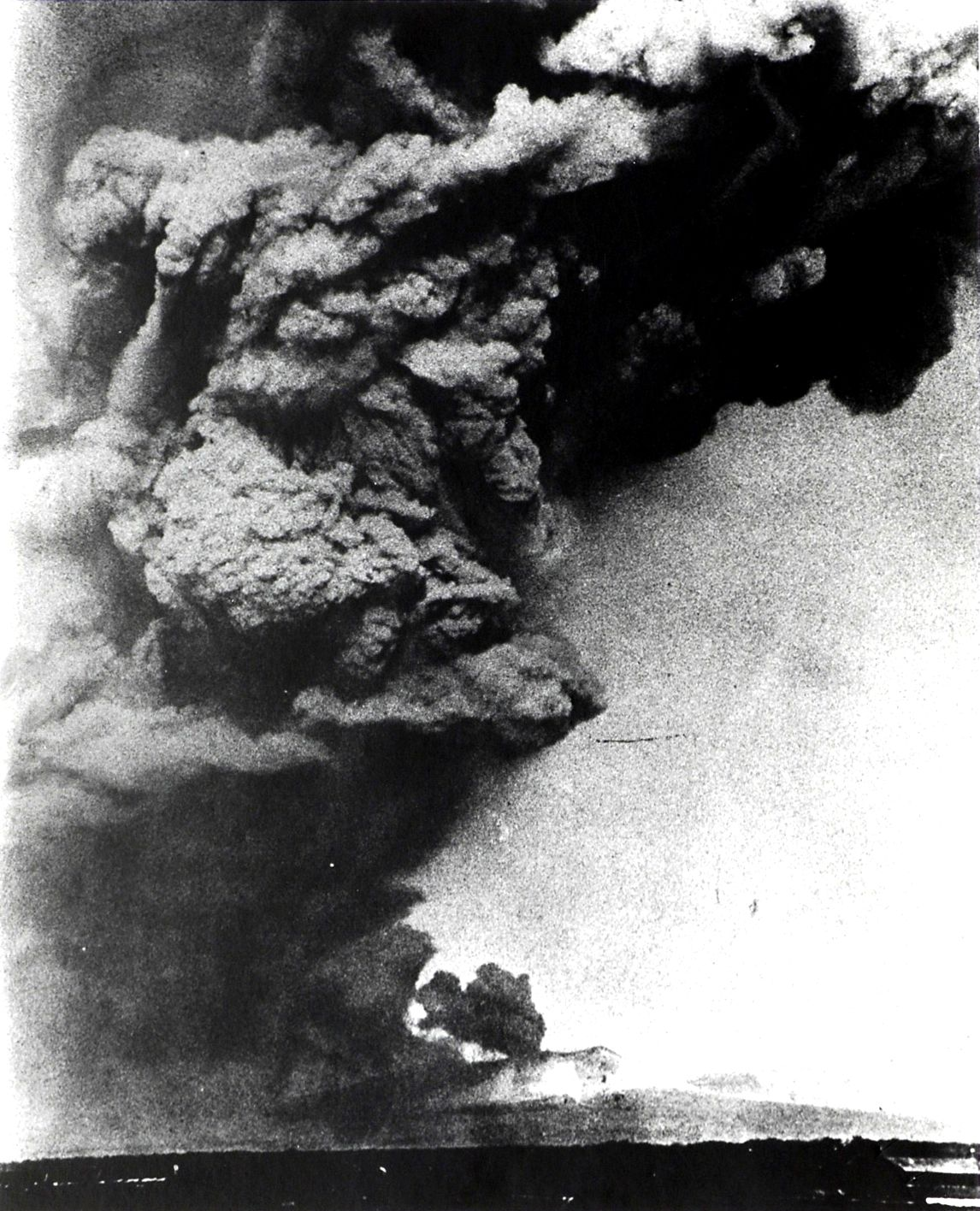
Mount Tarumae erupting in 1909.

The most recent eruption, in 1982, was a phreatic eruption. Previous major eruptions have occurred in 1667, 1739 (plinian eruption of VEI 5), and 1909. The 1667 and 1739 eruptions were responsible for its present shape. Other eruptions were in 1919–21, 1923, 1926, 1933, 1936, 1944, 1951, 1953–55, and 1978.

Tarumae is an 'A' rank volcano — most likely to erupt in the relatively near future.

== Hokkaido Natural Monument ==
Designated as a Hokkaido Natural Monument, it is popular as an easy climb for hikers who may start at the seventh station and then take an hour to reach the crater.

At the foot of Tarumae on the north-west side one can find an impressive moss-covered cavern (Koke-no-domon).

== Gallery ==
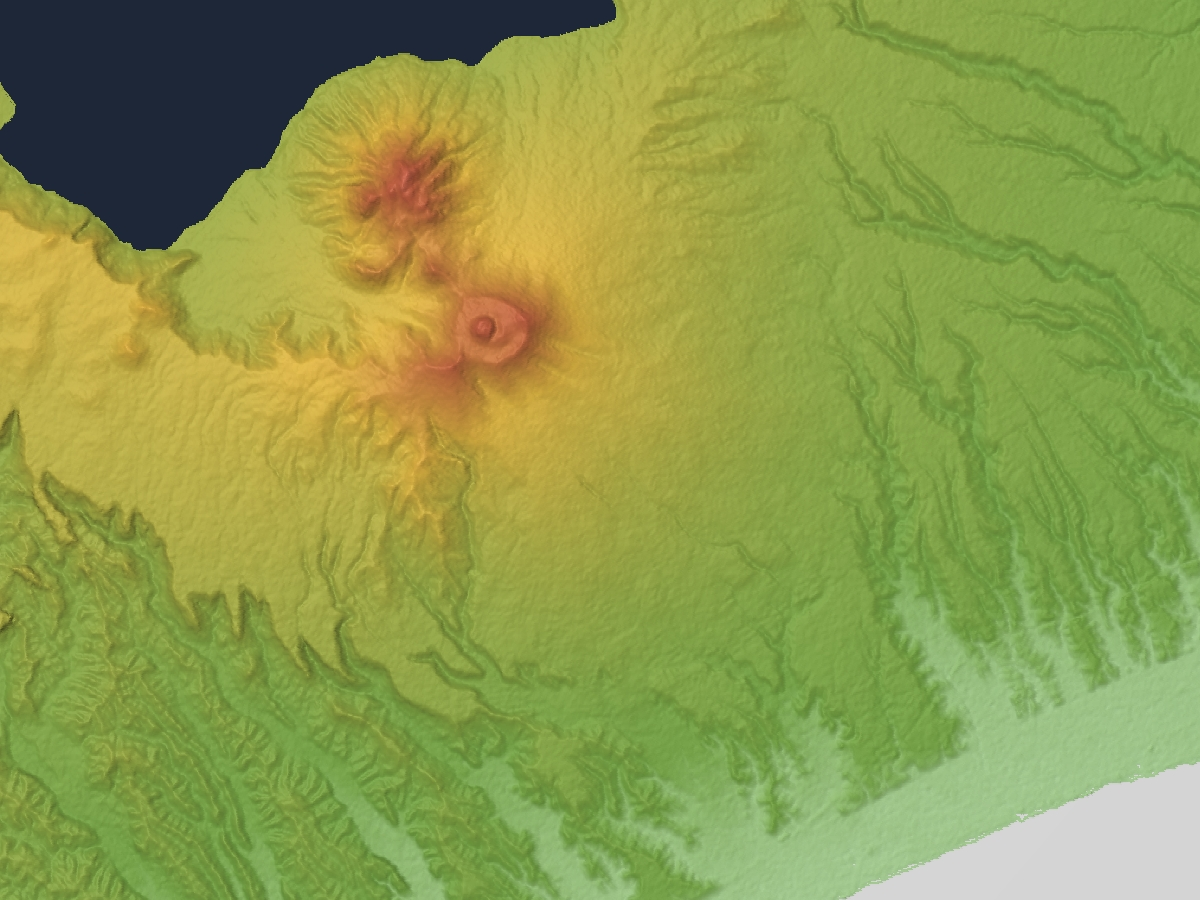
Relief Map

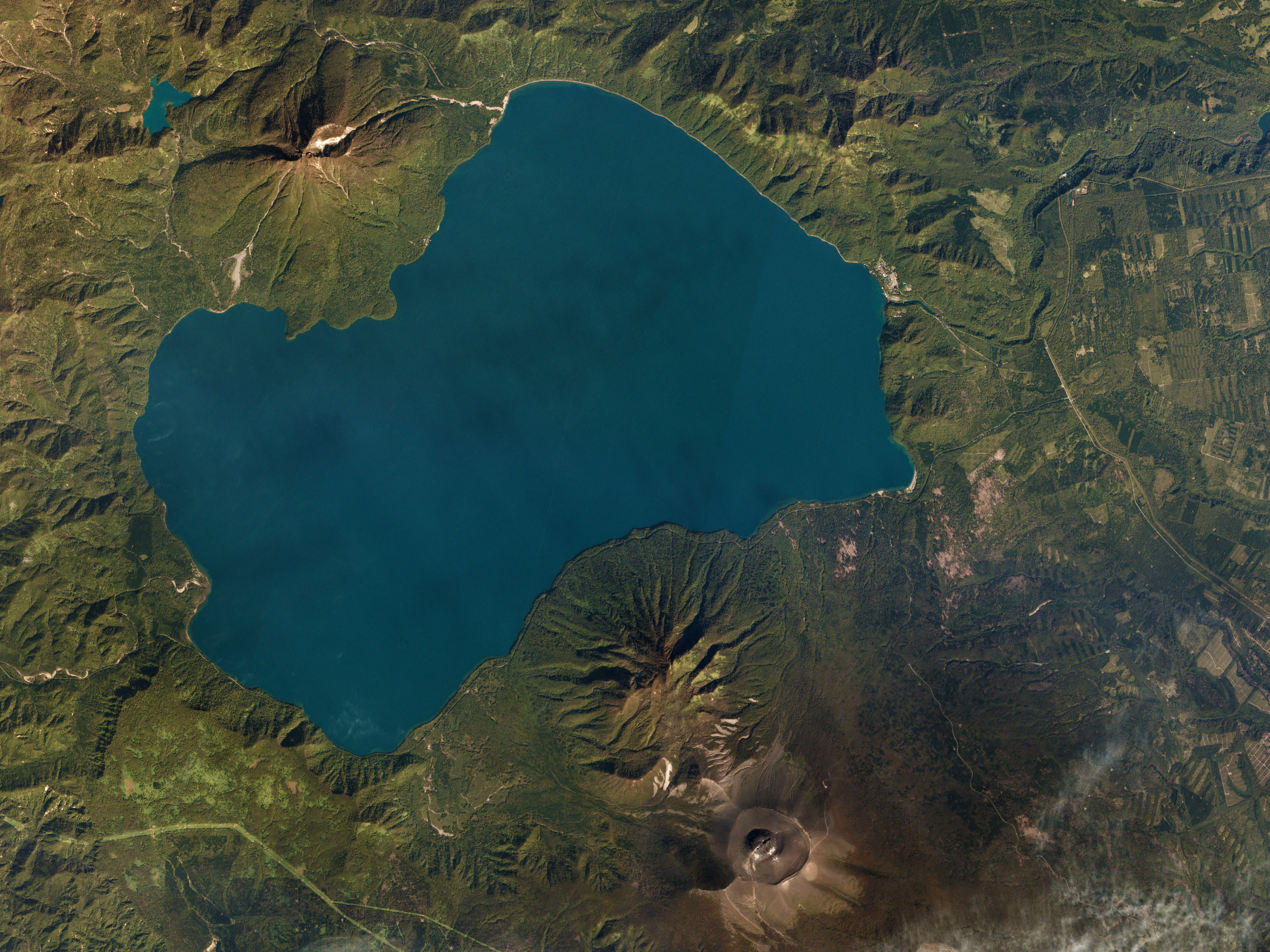
With Lake Shikotsu. Mount Tarumae in the bottom.

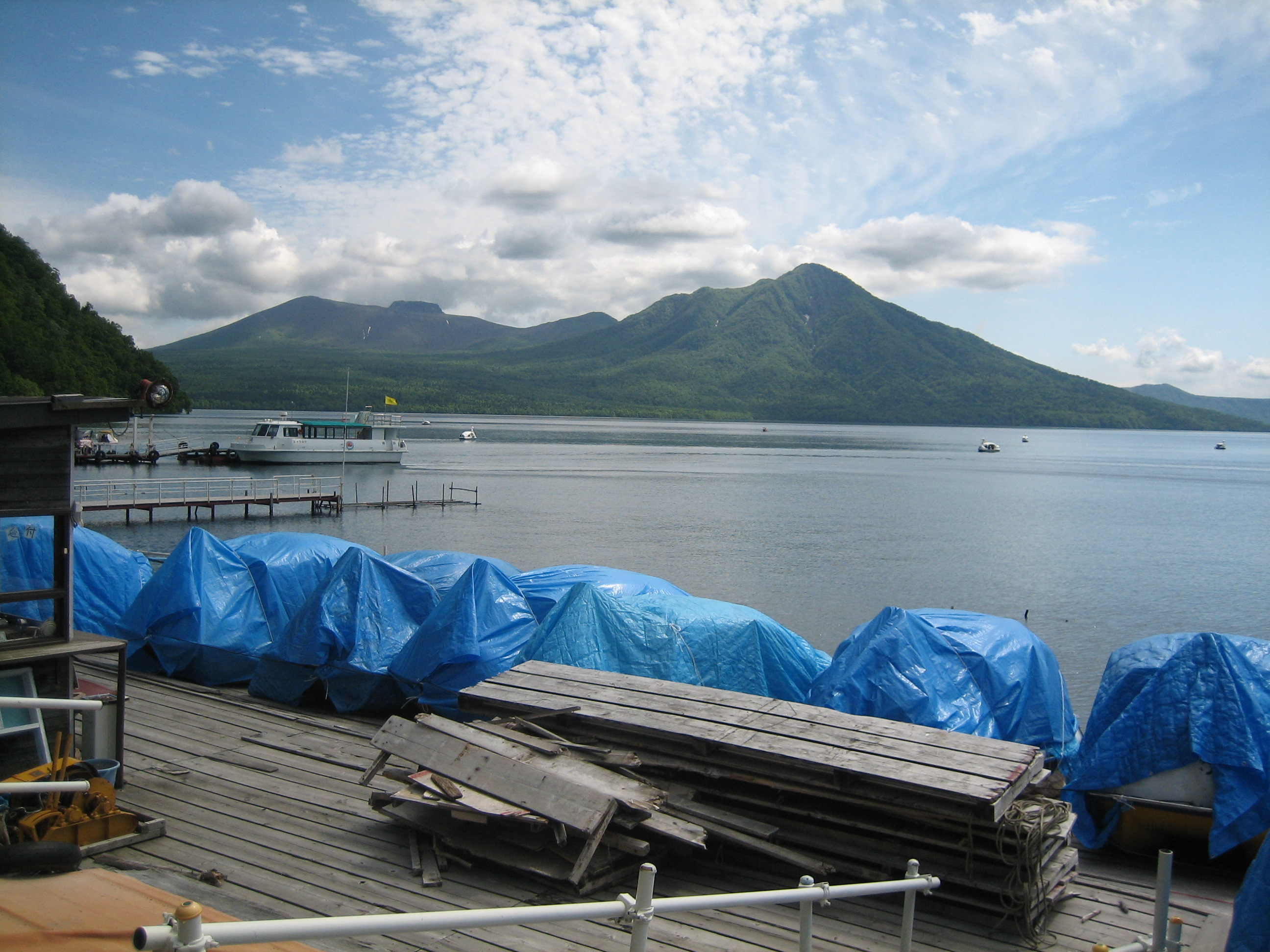
Mt. Tarumae and Mt. Fuppuishi as seen from the NNE.

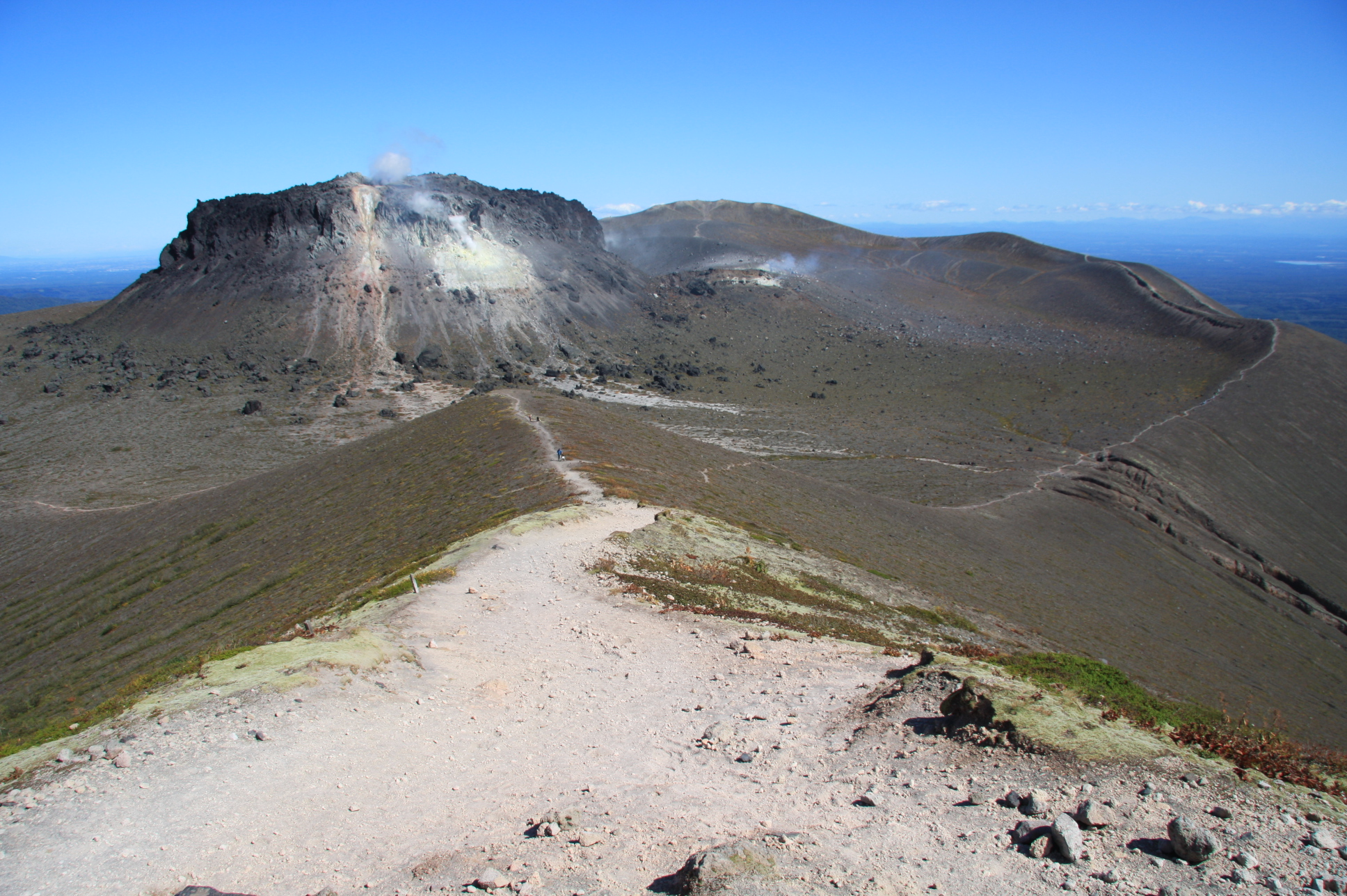
Lava Dome

== See also ==
- List of volcanoes in Japan
- List of mountains in Japan
- Tarumaezan Shrine
