= Muroran Main Line =

Railway line in Hokkaido, Japan

- A 789 series EMU on a Suzuran limited express service

Overview
- Owner: JR Hokkaido
- Locale: Hokkaido
- Termini: Oshamambe; Iwamizawa
- Stations: 44 (main line); 5 (branch line)

Service
- Type: Regional rail
- Operators: JR Hokkaido; JR Freight

History
- Opened: 1892; 134 years ago

Technical
- Track gauge: 1,067 mm (3 ft 6 in)
- Electrification: AC 20 KV 50 Hz with Overhead catenary (Higashi-Muroran to Numanohata, and Muroran to Higashi-Muroran branch)
Route map

The Muroran Main Line (室蘭本線, Muroran-honsen) is a railway line in Hokkaido operated by Hokkaido Railway Company (JR Hokkaido), between Oshamambe Station in Oshamambe and Iwamizawa Station in Iwamizawa, approximately paralleling the coast of Iburi Subprefecture. There also is a branch line within Muroran, between Higashi-muroran and Muroran Station.

The 28.7 km (17.8 mi) section between Shiraoi and Numanohata is the longest straight railway section in Japan.

On 19 November 2016, JR Hokkaido's president announced plans to rationalize the network by up to 1,237 km, or ~50% of the current network, including the proposed transfer of the Tomakomai–Iwamizawa section of this line to third-sector operation. However, if local governments do not come up with an agreement, the section may face closure.

== Basic data ==
- Operators, distances
  - Hokkaido Railway Company (Services and tracks)
    - From Oshamambe to Iwamizawa: 211.0 km
    - From Higashi-Muroran to Muroran: 7.0 km
  - Japan Freight Railway Company (Services)
    - From Oshamambe to Iwamizawa: 211.0 km
- Track:
  - Double: 176.7 km
    - From Oshamambe to Tōya: 41.5 km
    - From Usu to Nagawa: 4.9 km
    - From Mareppu to Mikawa: 118.2 km
    - From Yuni to Kuriyama: 5.1 km
    - From Muroran to Higashi-Muroran: 7.0 km
  - Single: the remainder
- Electric supply:
  - From Muroran, via Higashi-Muroran to Numanohata: 74.9 km (20,000 V AC)
  - Other sections are not electrified.
- Block system: Automatic

== Services ==
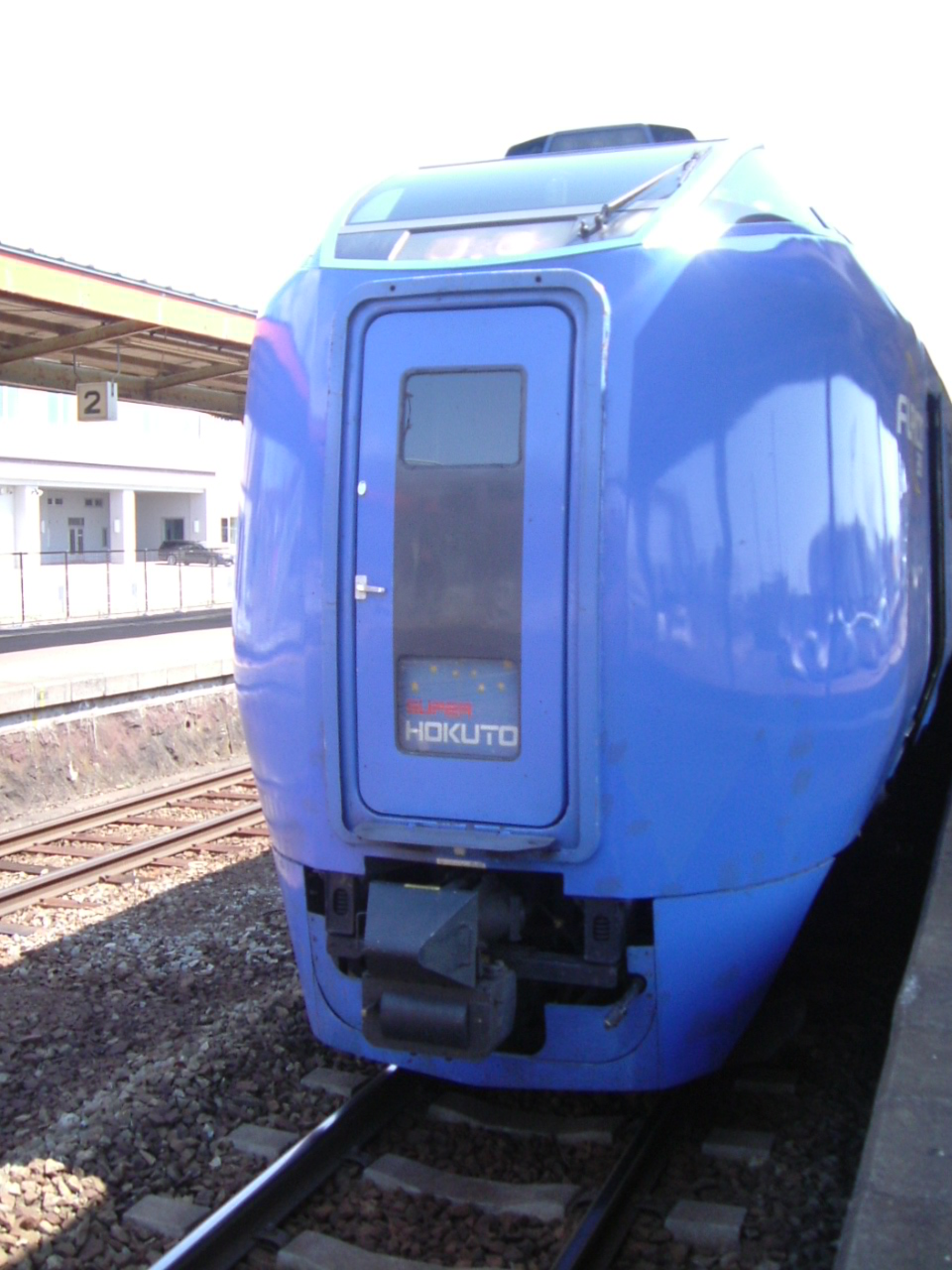
A Super Hokuto limited express train

The section between Oshamambe and Numanohata is the part of the main link route between Sapporo and Hakodate. As such, the limited express trains Super Hokuto and Hokuto run between two cities once per 1 to 2 hours, as well as Suzuran between Sapporo and Muroran.

As for the local service, the line is roughly divided into four sections, namely the section between Oshamambe and Higashi-Muroran, between Higashi-Muroran and Muroran, between Higashi-Muroran and Tomakomai, and between Tomakomai and Iwamizawa. The last section was once an important freight route, but became a quiet local line after coal mines closed.

=== Former services ===
Prior to the opening of the Hokkaido Shinkansen, there were also sleeping car trains between Honshu and Hokkaido, such as the Hokutosei, Cassiopeia, Twilight Express, and Hamanasu.

== Stations ==
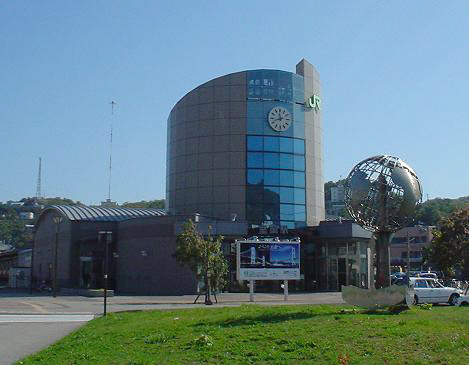
Muroran Station

Some local trains may skip Koboro (marked "◌").

Station			Distance (km)	Transfers	Location
H47	Oshamambe	長万部	0.0	■■ Hakodate Main Line	Oshamambe, Yamakoshi
H46	Shizukari	静狩	10.6		Oshamambe, Yamakoshi
H45	Koboro ◌	小幌	17.5		Toyoura, Abuta
H44	Rebun	礼文	23.6		Toyoura, Abuta
H43	Ōkishi	大岸	27.7		Toyoura, Abuta
H42	Toyoura	豊浦	36.1		Toyoura, Abuta
H41	Tōya	洞爺	41.5		Tōyako, Abuta
H40	Usu	有珠	46.6		Date
H39	Nagawa	長和	51.5		Date
H38	Date-Mombetsu	伊達紋別	54.5		Date
H37	Kita-Funaoka	北舟岡	57.4		Date
H36	Mareppu	稀府	60.6		Date
H35	Kogane	黄金	65.1		Date
H34	Sakimori	崎守	67.3		Muroran
	Jinyamachi Freight Terminal	陣屋町(貨)	69.7		Muroran
H33	Moto-Wanishi	本輪西	72.7		Muroran
H32	Higashi-Muroran	東室蘭	77.2	■ Muroran Main Line (Branch Line)	Muroran
	Higashi-Muroran Freight Terminal	東室蘭(貨)	78.2		Muroran
H31	Washibetsu	鷲別	79.1		Noboribetsu
H30	Horobetsu	幌別	86.8		Noboribetsu
H29	Tomiura	富浦	92.3		Noboribetsu
H28	Noboribetsu	登別	94.7		Noboribetsu
H27	Kojōhama	虎杖浜	98.1		Shiraoi, Shiraoi
H26	Takeura	竹浦	102.9		Shiraoi, Shiraoi
H25	Kita-yoshihara	北吉原	105.7		Shiraoi, Shiraoi
H24	Hagino	萩野	107.8		Shiraoi, Shiraoi
H23	Shiraoi	白老	113.6		Shiraoi, Shiraoi
H22	Shadai	社台	119.1		Shiraoi, Shiraoi
H21	Nishikioka	錦岡	125.4		Tomakomai
H20	Itoi	糸井	130.6		Tomakomai
H19	Aoba	青葉	132.8		Tomakomai
H18	Tomakomai	苫小牧	135.2	■ Hidaka Main Line	Tomakomai
	Tomakomai Freight Terminal	苫小牧(貨)	138.6		Tomakomai
H17	Numanohata	沼ノ端	144.0	■ Chitose Line	Tomakomai
	Toasa	遠浅	152.9		Abira, Yūfutsu
	Hayakita	早来	158.3		Abira, Yūfutsu
	Abira	安平	164.0		Abira, Yūfutsu
K15	Oiwake	追分	170.8	■ Sekishō Line	Abira, Yūfutsu
	Mikawa	三川	178.8		Yuni, Yūbari
	Furusan	古山	182.2		Yuni, Yūbari
	Yuni	由仁	186.4		Yuni, Yūbari
	Kuriyama	栗山	191.5		Kuriyama, Yūbari
	Kurioka	栗丘	195.7		Iwamizawa
	Kurisawa	栗沢	199.6		Iwamizawa
	Shibun	志文	203.9		Iwamizawa
A13	Iwamizawa	岩見沢	211.0	■ Hakodate Main Line	Iwamizawa

=== Branch Line ===
Station			Distance (km)	Transfers	Location
H32	Higashi-Muroran	東室蘭	0.0	■ Muroran Main Line (Main Line)	Muroran
M33	Wanishi	輪西	2.3		Muroran
M34	Misaki	御崎	4.2		Muroran
M35	Bokoi	母恋	5.9		Muroran
M36	Muroran	室蘭	7.0		Muroran

== Rolling stock ==
=== Local ===
- KiHa 40 series DMUs
- KiHa 143 DMUs (Oshamambe to Numanohata)
- KiHa 150 DMUs (Oshamambe to Tomakomai)
- 711 series EMUs (until 26 October 2012)
- 737 series EMUs (Tomakomai to Muroran, from spring 2023)

=== Limited express ===
Suzuran
785 series AC EMUs
789 series AC EMUs
Super Hokuto
KiHa 281 series DMUs
KiHa 261-1000 series DMUs
Hokuto
KiHa 183 series DMUs

== History ==
In 1892, the Hokkaido Colliery and Railway Company opened the line from Muroran (now Higashi-Muroran) to Iwamizawa. The line was built to link coal mines in the Iwamizawa-Asahikawa region and Muroran Port. The line was extended to the current Muroran in 1897. The Japanese Government nationalized the Hokkaido Colliery Railway in 1906, and the Higashi-Muroran–Muroran section was double-tracked in 1910.

The section between Oshamambe and Higashi-Muroran was opened between 1923 and 1928 as the Osawa Line (長輪線, Osawa-sen) by the Imperial Japanese Government Railways, which later became the Japanese National Railways (JNR). The line was built to bypass the mountainous section of the Hakodate Main Line, as well as to link the inland Iburi to the Muroran Port. The two lines were merged into one in 1931, and renamed the Muroran Main Line, with the Higashi-Muroran–Muroran section becoming known as the branch line. In 1935, a rail motor service was established on the branch line.

Initially, the line mainly functioned as a freight line. However, with the reduction in coal being mined, from the 1960s the line's main traffic shifted to passengers. At present, all the intercity express trains between Sapporo and Hakodate operate over the Chitose and Muroran lines to Oshamambe, bypassing the north section of the Hakodate Main Line route.

The last steam locomotive hauled regular service ran between Iwamizawa and Muroran in 1975.

=== Duplication ===
Growing coal traffic on the Iwamizawa–Muroran section resulted in the double-tracking of the 101 km Higashi-Muroran–Mikawa section in stages between 1920 and 1958. The 7 km Iwamizawa–Shibun section was double-tracked in 1961, but returned to single track in 1994. The 9 km Yuni–Kurioka section was doubled between 1968 and 1969, but the 4 km Kuriyama–Kurioka section became single track in 1990 as a result of the collapse of a tunnel.

The 42 km Oshamambe–Toya section was double-tracked between 1964 and 1975, involving the construction of ten new tunnels and realignments that reduced the route length by 1.7 km. Several of the abandoned single-track tunnels can be seen in this section.

The Usu–Nagawa section was double-tracked in 1968, and the Mareppu–Higashi-Muroran section was doubled in stages between 1968 and 1978, with five new tunnels and realignments shortening the route by 0.8 km.

=== Electrification ===
The Numanohata–Muroran section was electrified in 1980 in conjunction with the electrification of the Chitose Line to Sapporo.

=== Former connecting lines ===
- Toya station – A 9 km private line electrified at 600 V DC connected to Toyako, operating from 1929 until 1941.
- Date Monbetsu station – The Iburi line from Kutchan on the Hakodate Main Line was extended to Date Monbetsu between 1940 and 1941, and closed in 1986.
- Noboribetsu station – In 1915, a 762 mm (2 ft 6 in) gauge horse-drawn line opened to an onsen hot spring resort 9 km away. A steam locomotive was introduced in 1918, halving the journey time to 1 hour. The line was converted to 1,067 mm (3 ft 6 in) gauge and electrified at 600 V DC in 1925, reducing the journey to 35 minutes, but the line closed due to the economic depression in 1933.
- Tomakomai station – The Oji Paper Co. built a 762 mm (2 ft 6 in) gauge line a total distance of 35 km from 1908 to construct a series of hydro-electric power stations which opened in 1910, 1916, 1918, and 1919. In 1922, a summer-only tourist service was introduced, patronised by the Japanese Emperor. In 1934, the 8 kg/m rail was replaced with 10 kg/m rail, and in 1936 the passenger service became year-round. A fifth power station was opened in 1941, and the line was replaced by buses in 1951.
- Numanohata station – The Hokkaido Coal Co. opened a 70 km line to a coal mine near Hobetsu between 1922 and 1923. The line was nationalized in 1943, and a 3.6 km connecting line built from Mukawa to the line, with the Hidaka Main Line becoming the route to the Muroran Port, and the initial 24 km section to Numanohata closing.
- Hayakita station – A horse-drawn timber tramway was opened to Atsuma (8 km) in 1904, and extended a further 10 km to Horonoi in 1927. Petrol locomotives were introduced in 1931. The Horonoi – Atsuma section closed in 1948, with the remainder closing in 1951.
- Kuriyama station – The Hokkaido Colliery and Steamship Co. built a 34 km line from Kuriyama (including a bridge over the line) to Yubari in 1926, including a switch-back (or zig-zag) section at Nishikisawa. A 23 km extension opened from Kuriyama–Nopporo (on the Hakodate Main Line 18 km east of Sapporo) in 1930. At its peak in 1965, the line carried 1.5 million tonnes of coal and another 0.5 million tonnes of general freight annually, as well as 2 million passengers. The entire line closed in 1975 after the closure of the mine in 1972. A 4.7 km branch to the Tsunoda mine operated from 1927 until 1970.
- Shibun station – A 24 km line to a coal mine at Manjitanzan opened in 1914, with passenger services provided from 1924. The mine closed in 1978, and the line closed in 1985. A 3 km horse-drawn line opened to the Hokusei coal mine in 1920, with a steam locomotive and passenger carriages introduced in 1946. The line and mine closed in 1967.

== See also ==
- Hakodate Main Line
- Chitose Line
- List of railway lines in Japan
