= Shiraoi Station =

Railway station in Hokkaido, Japan

Coordinates: 42.5543°N 141.3598°E

H23 Shiraoi Station 白老駅
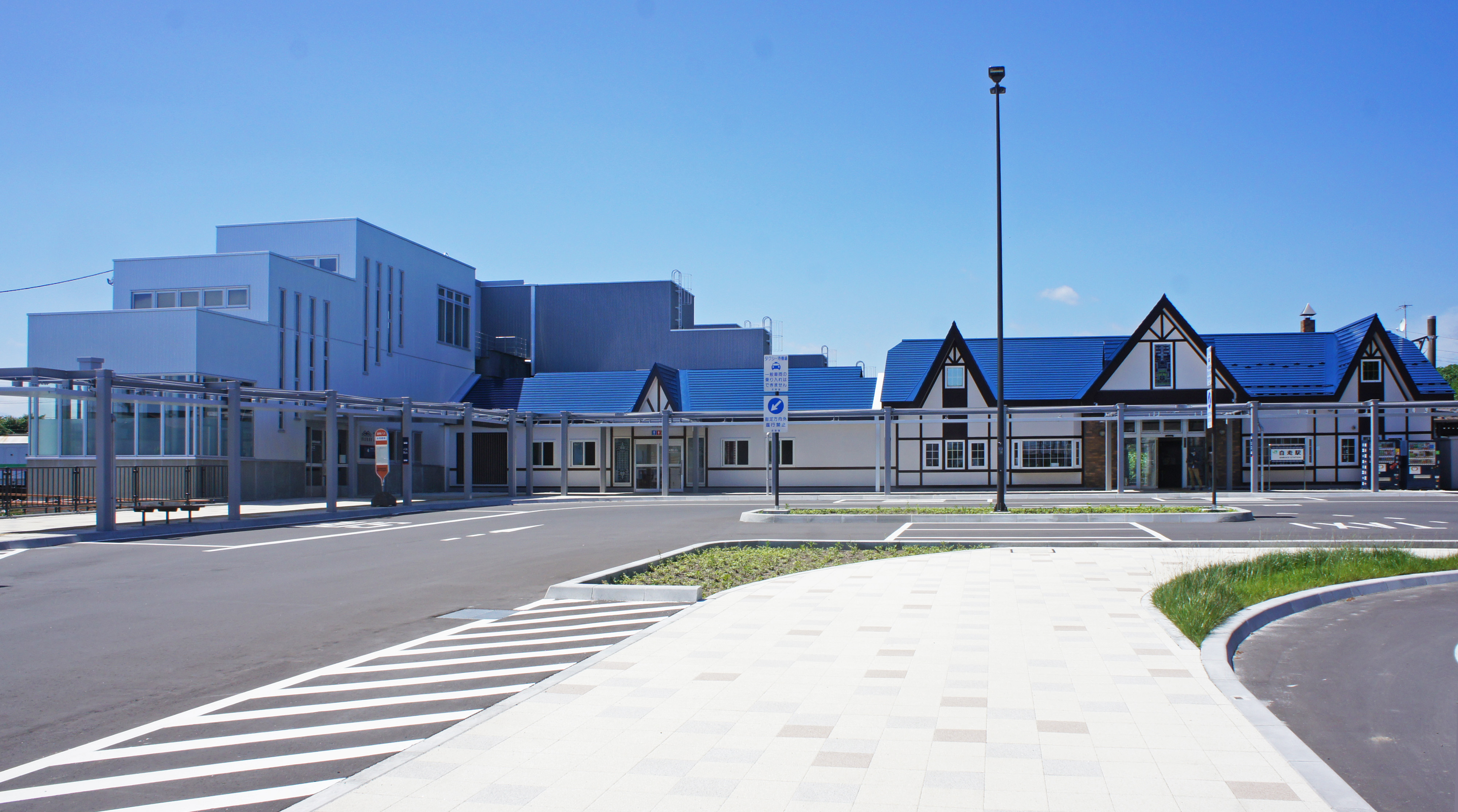
- Station building

General information
- Location: 1 Higashimachi, Shiraoi Town, Shiraoi District; Hokkaido Prefecture; Japan
- Operator: JR Hokkaido
- Line: Muroran Main Line
- Platforms: 2 side platforms
- Tracks: 3 (1 bypass)

Construction
- Structure type: At grade

Other information
- Station code: H23

Services
Preceding station	JR Hokkaido	Following station
Hagino towards Oshamambe	Muroran Main Line	Shadai towards Iwamizawa
Noboribetsu towards Hakodate	Hokuto	Tomakomai towards Sapporo
Noboribetsu towards Higashi-Muroran	Suzuran	Tomakomai towards Sapporo
Location
- Location within Hokkaido Location within Japan

Shiraoi Station (白老駅, Shiraoi-eki) is a train station in Shiraoi, Shiraoi District, Hokkaidō, Japan.

== Lines ==
- Hokkaido Railway Company
  - Muroran Main Line Station H23
