= Suzuran =

Train service in Japan

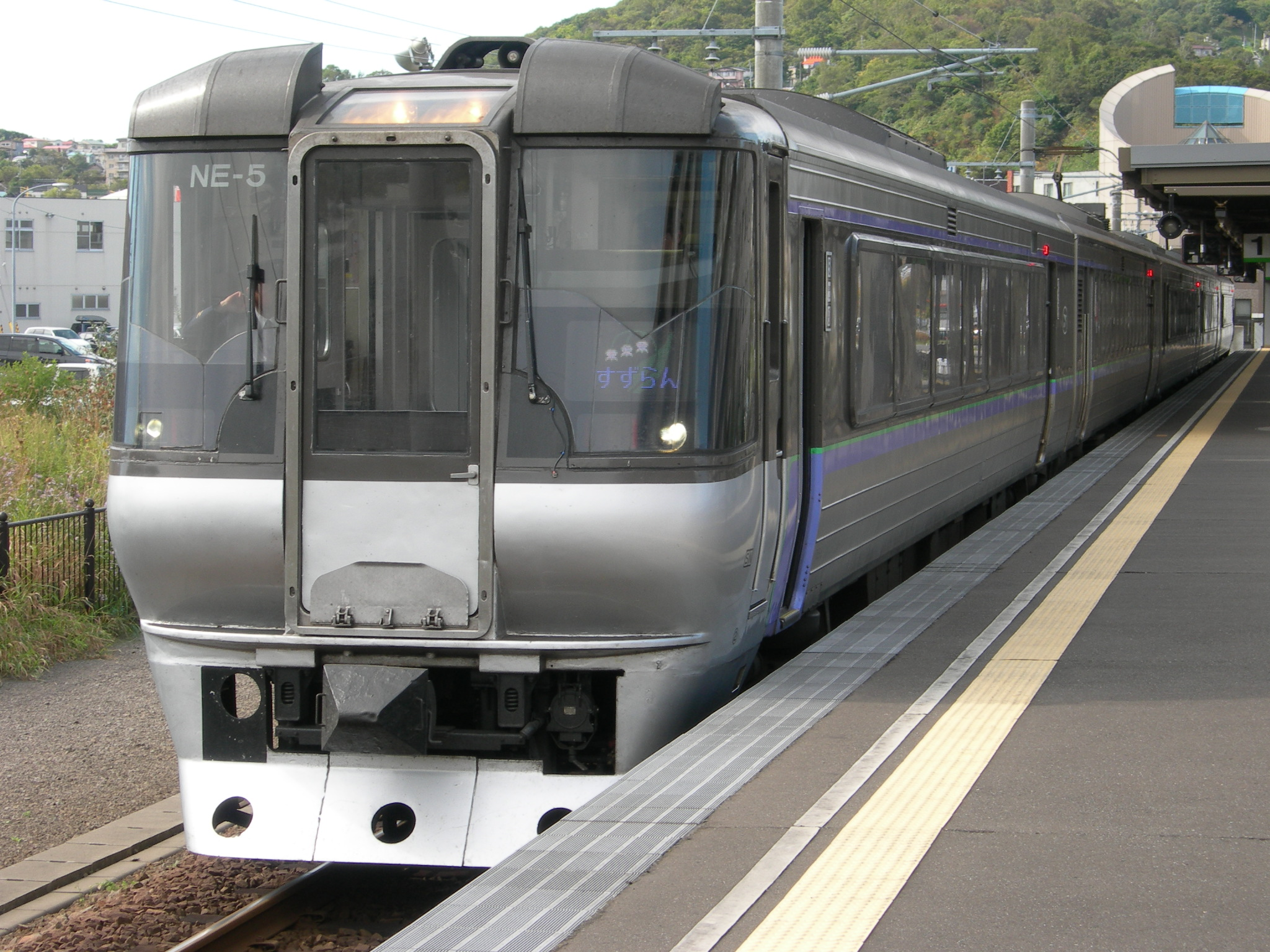
- 785 series EMU on a Suzuran service at Muroran Station, October 2007

Overview
- Service type: Limited express
- Status: In operation
- Locale: Hokkaido
- First service: 1956 (Express); July 1992 (Limited express)
- Current operator: JR Hokkaido
- Former operator: JNR

Route
- Termini: Sapporo; Higashi-Muroran, Muroran
- Stops: 15
- Distance travelled: 136.2 km (84.6 mi)
- Average journey time: 1 hour 45 minutes approx
- Service frequency: 6 return workings daily

On-board services
- Class: Standard class only
- Disabled access: Yes
- Sleeping arrangements: None
- Catering facilities: None
- Observation facilities: None
- Entertainment facilities: None
- Other facilities: Toilets, AC outlets (u-Seats only)

Technical
- Rolling stock: 789-1000 series & 785 series EMUs
- Track gauge: 1,067 mm (3 ft 6 in)
- Electrification: 20 kV AC overhead
- Operating speed: 120 km/h (75 mph)
- Track owner: JR Hokkaido

Suzuran (すずらん; "Lily of the valley") is a limited express train service operated by Hokkaido Railway Company (JR Hokkaido) between Muroran and Sapporo in Hokkaido, Japan. The current limited express service was introduced in July 1992, but the name was first used from 1956 for an express service operated by JNR between Hakodate and Sapporo.

== Stops ==
Trains stop at the following stations:

Line	Station	Note
Chitose	01 Sapporo	
Chitose	H05 Shin-Sapporo	
Chitose	H13 Chitose	
Chitose	H14 Minami-Chitose	
Chitose	H17 Numanohata	
Muroran	M18 Tomakomai	
Muroran	M23 Shiraoi	
Muroran	M28 Noboribetsu	
Muroran	M30 Horobetsu	
Muroran	M31 Washibetsu	
Muroran	M32 Higashi-Muroran	Suzuran 2 Terminates here Suzuran 5 Starts here
Muroran Branch	M33 Wanishi	Trains here are designated a Local Train
Muroran Branch	M34 Misaki	Trains here are designated a Local Train
Muroran Branch	M35 Bokoi	Trains here are designated a Local Train
Muroran Branch	M36 Muroran	Trains here are designated a Local Train

- Train becomes a Local Train between Higashi-Muroran station and Wanishi station.
- Suzuran No. 2 terminates at Higashi-Muroran.
- Suzuran No. 5 starts from Higashi-Muroran.

== Rolling stock ==
Services are formed of 5-car 785 series and 789-1000 series EMUs. All seats are non-reserved, except for car 4, which has improved "u-Seat" accommodation, including AC outlets for personal use.

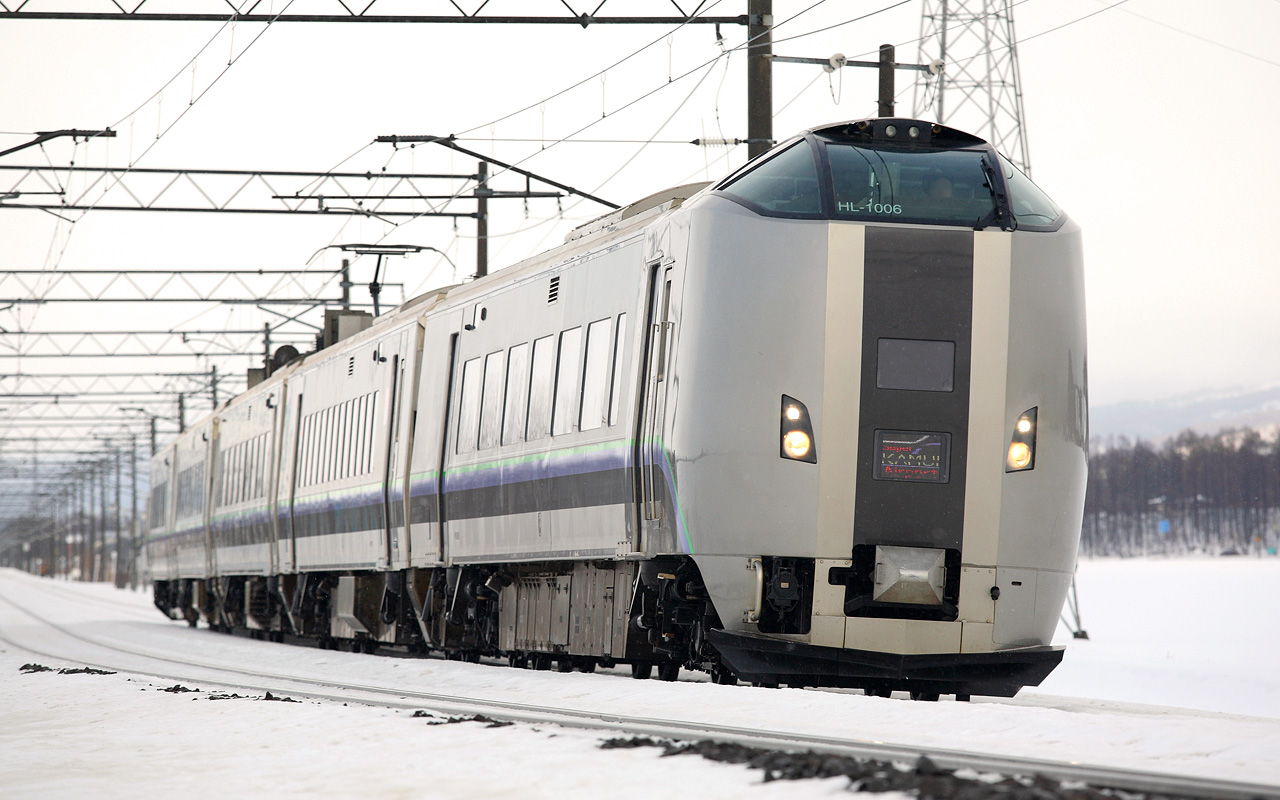
A 789-1000 series EMU, January 2009

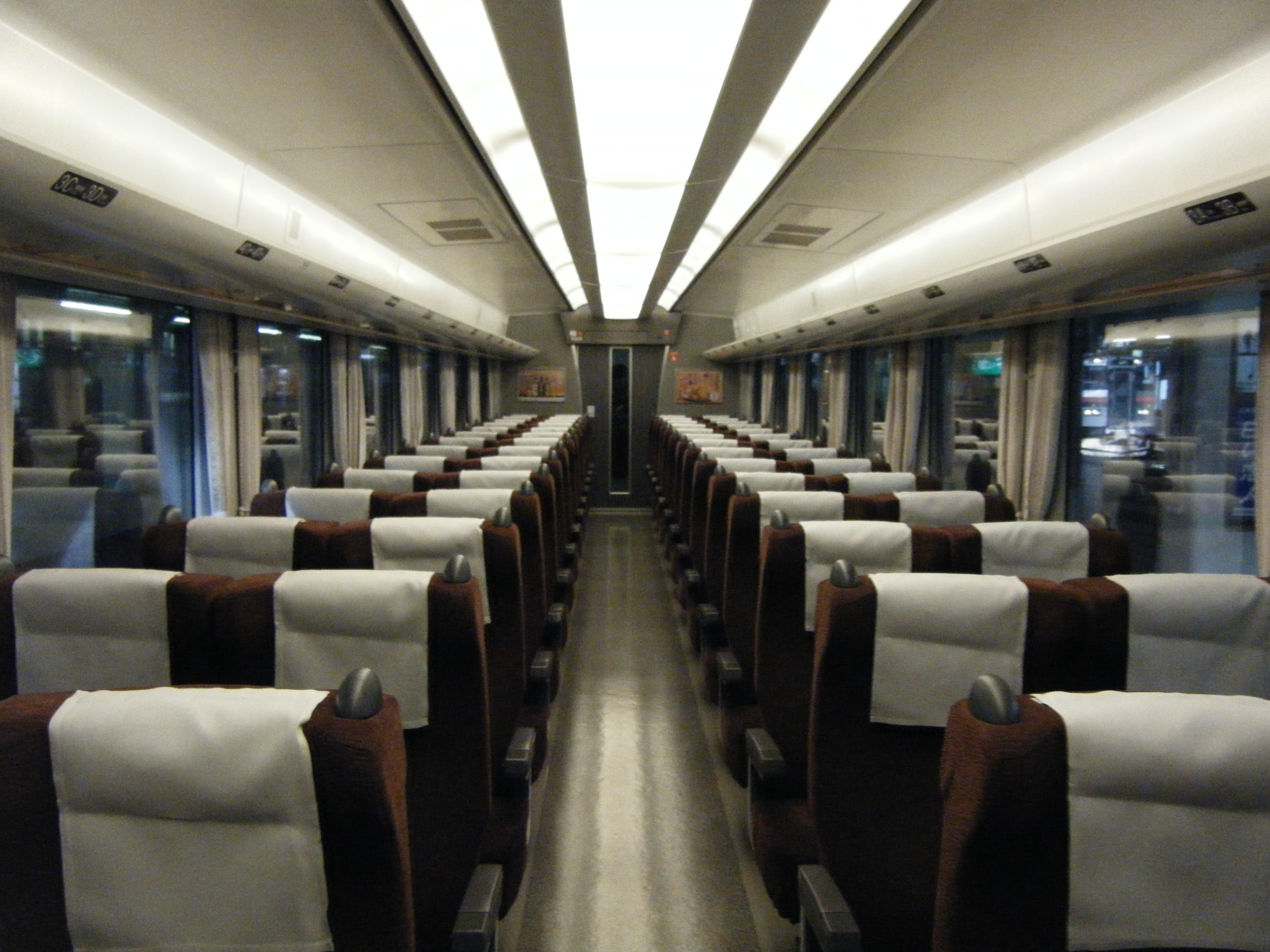
785 series non-reserved seating, May 2008

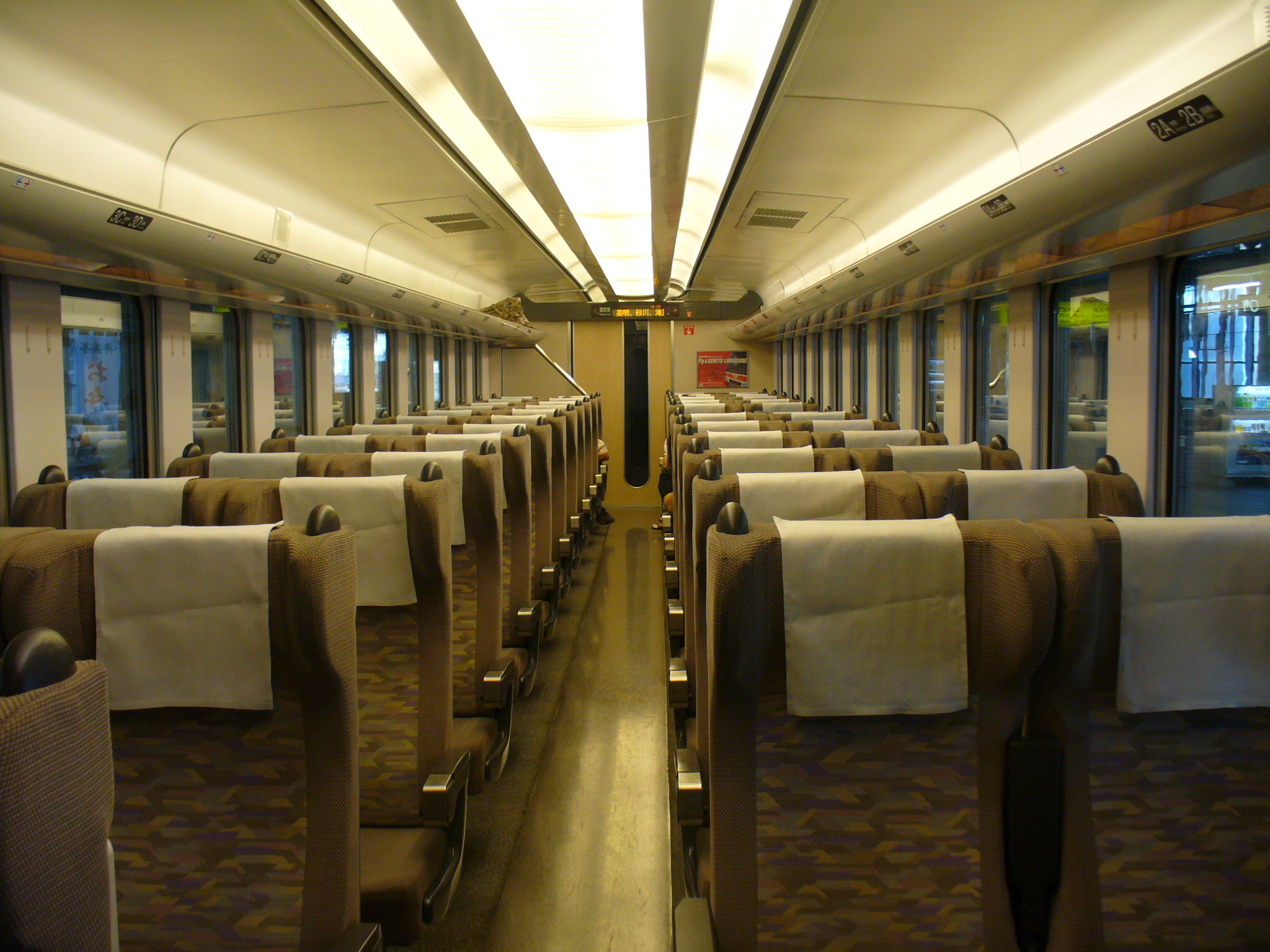
785 series reserved "u-Seat" car, August 2007

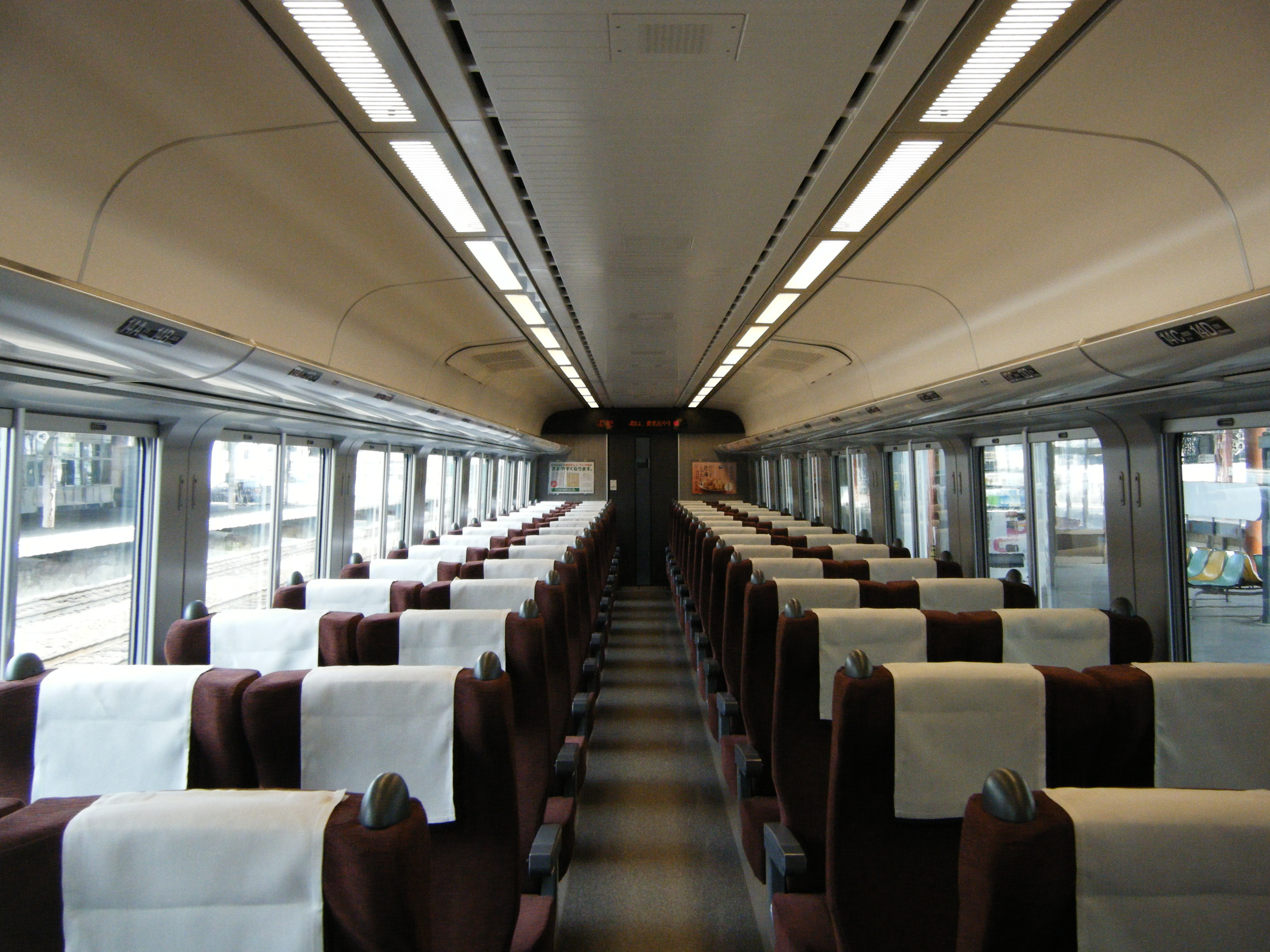
789-1000 series non-reserved seating, May 2008

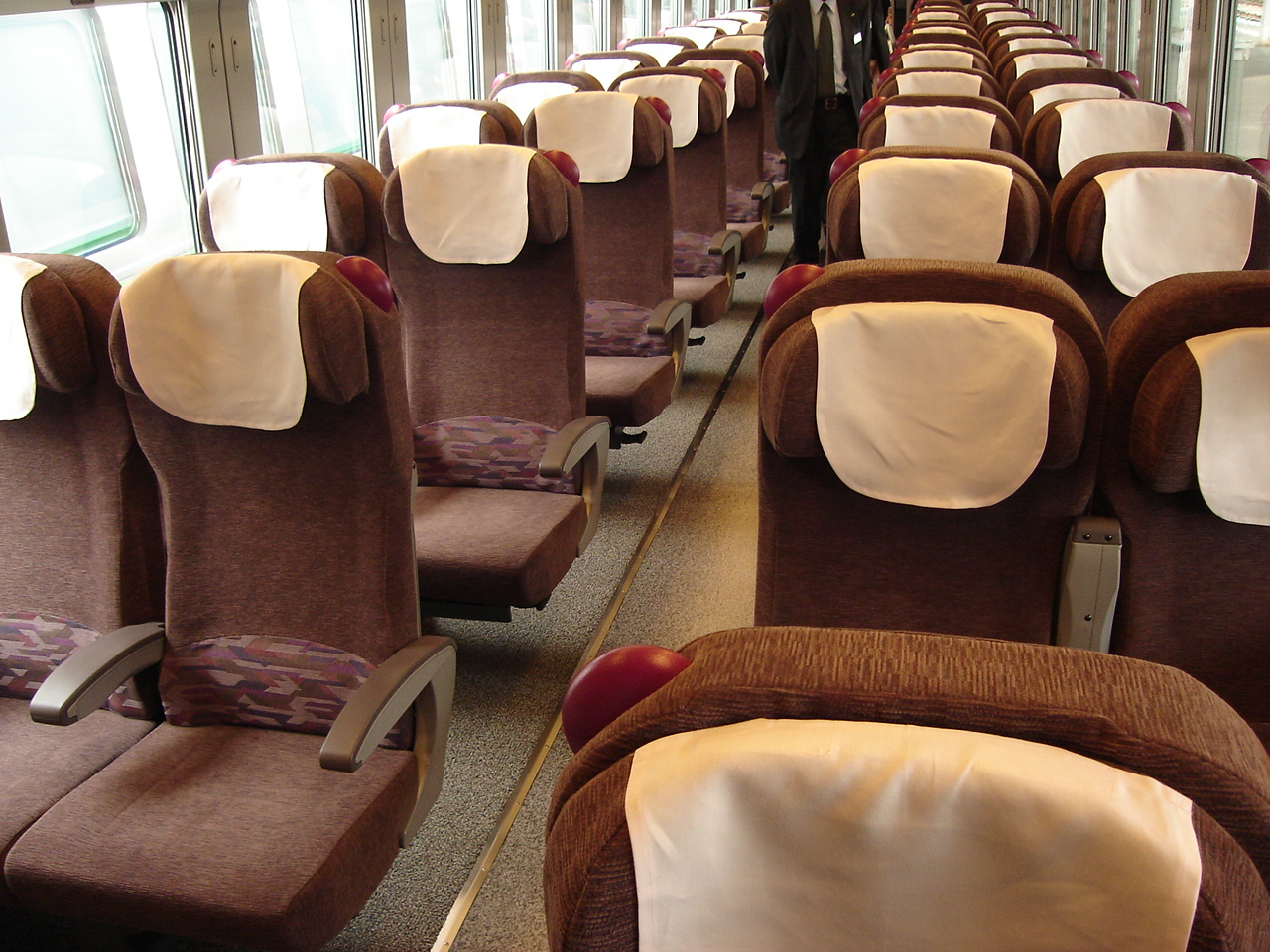
789-1000 series reserved "u-Seat" car, September 2007

=== Formations ===
Trains are formed as shown below, with car 1 at the Muroran end.

Car No.	1	2	3	4	5
Accommodation	Non-reserved	Non-reserved	Non-reserved	Reserved (u-Seat)	Non-reserved
Facilities		Toilet		Wheelchair space, toilet	Toilet

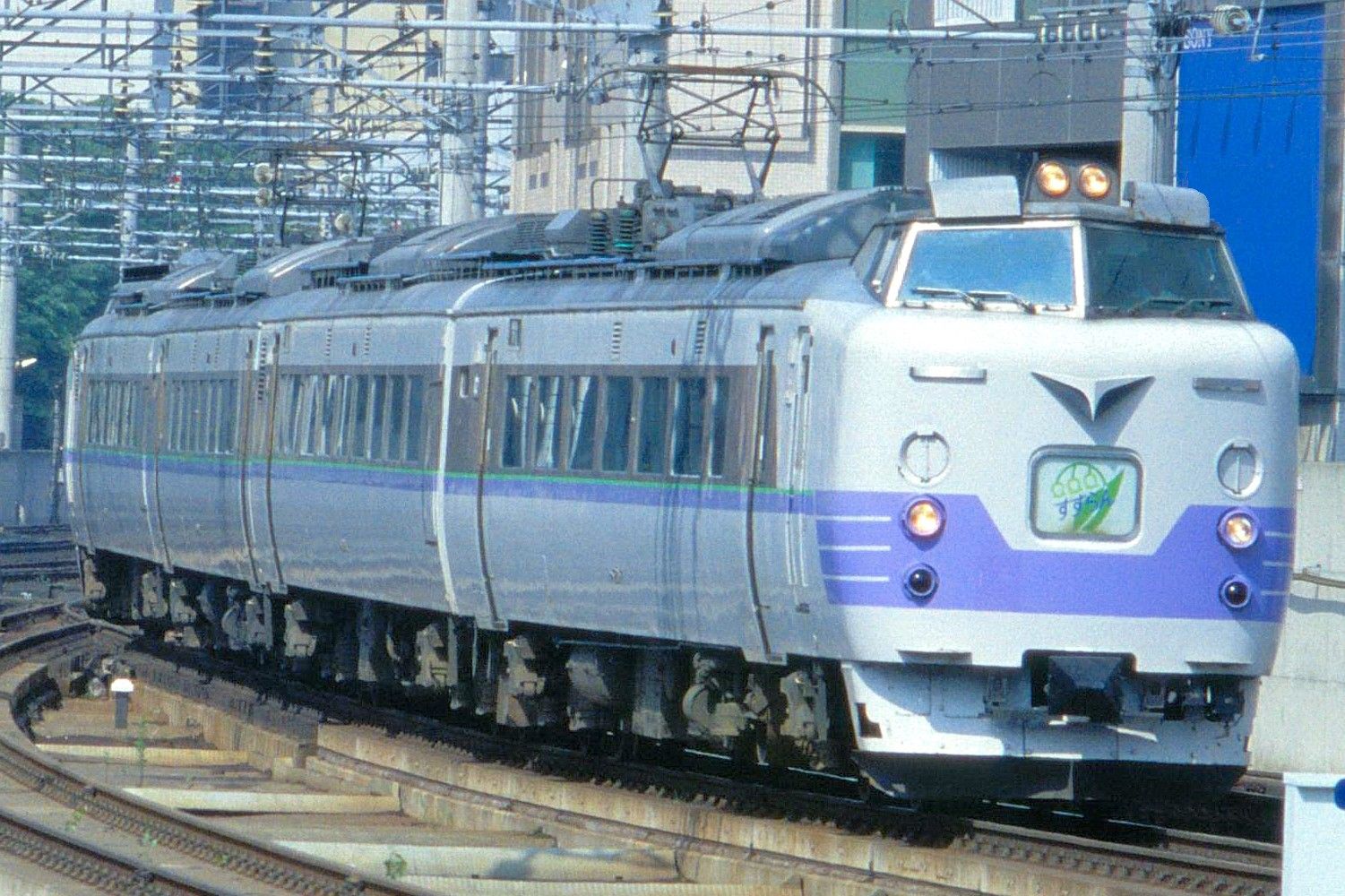
781 series EMU on Suzuran service at Sapporo Station, June 2001

From July 1992 until 30 September 2007, Suzuran services were formed of 4-car 781 series EMUs, with one reserved car (car 4), formed as shown below.

Car No.	1	2	3	4
Accommodation	Non-reserved	Non-reserved	Non-reserved	Reserved
Facilities	Toilet	Vending machine	Telephone, toilet	

== See also ==
- List of named passenger trains of Japan
