= Kojōhama Station =

Railway station in Shiraoi, Hokkaido, Japan

Coordinates: 42.4647°N 141.2150°E

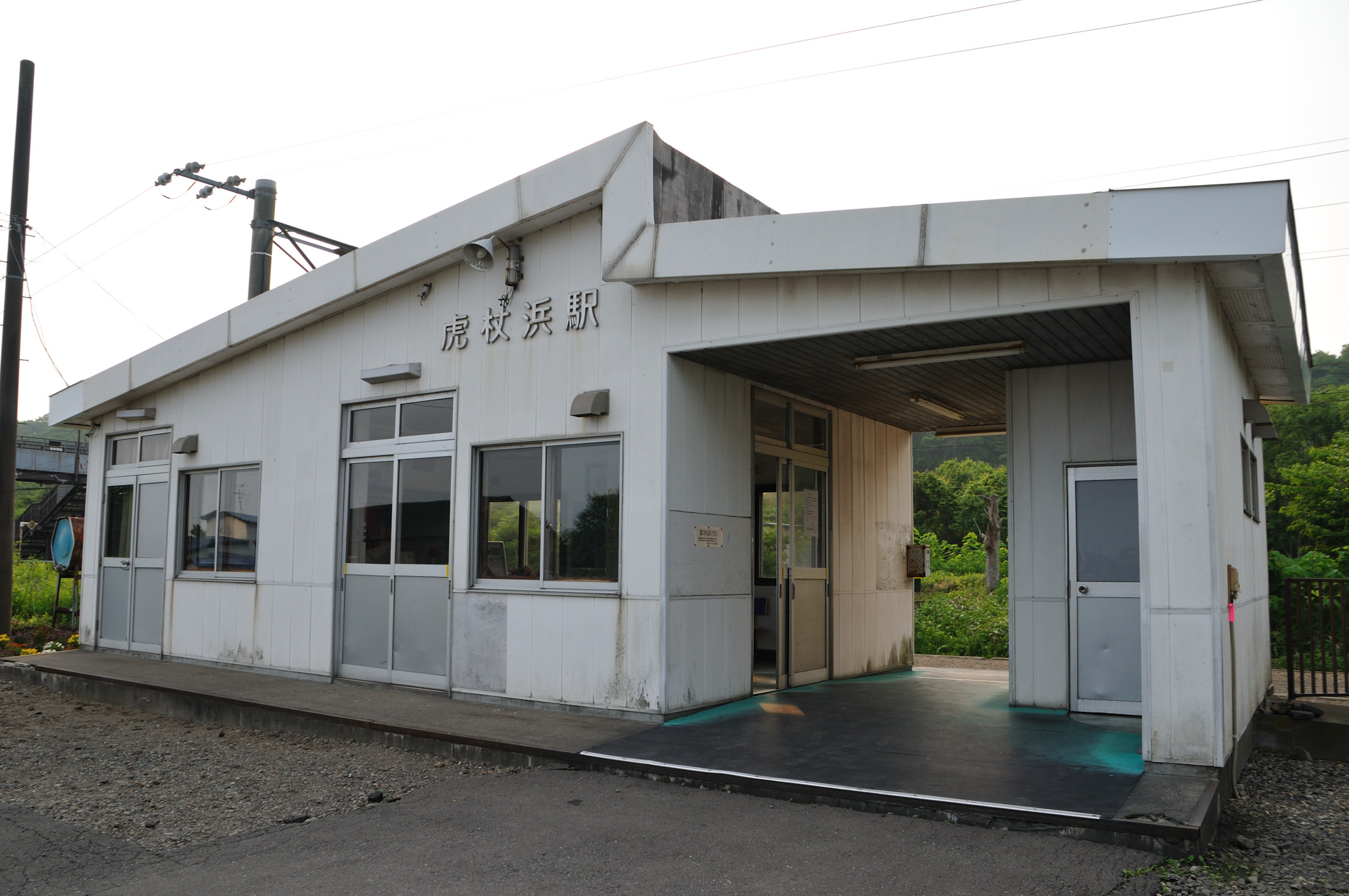
Station building

Kojōhama Station (虎杖浜駅, Kojōhama-eki) is a train station in Shiraoi, Shiraoi District, Hokkaidō, Japan.

== Lines ==
- Hokkaido Railway Company
  - Muroran Main Line Station H27

== Adjacent stations ==
«	Service	»
Muroran Main Line
Noboribetsu	-	Takeura
