= Tomiura Station =

Tomiura Station (富浦駅) is the name of two train stations in Japan:

- Tomiura Station (Chiba)
- Tomiura Station (Hokkaidō)
