= Horobetsu Station =

Railway station in Noboribetsu, Hokkaido, Japan

Coordinates: 42.4096°N 141.1073°E

H30 Horobetsu Station 幌別駅
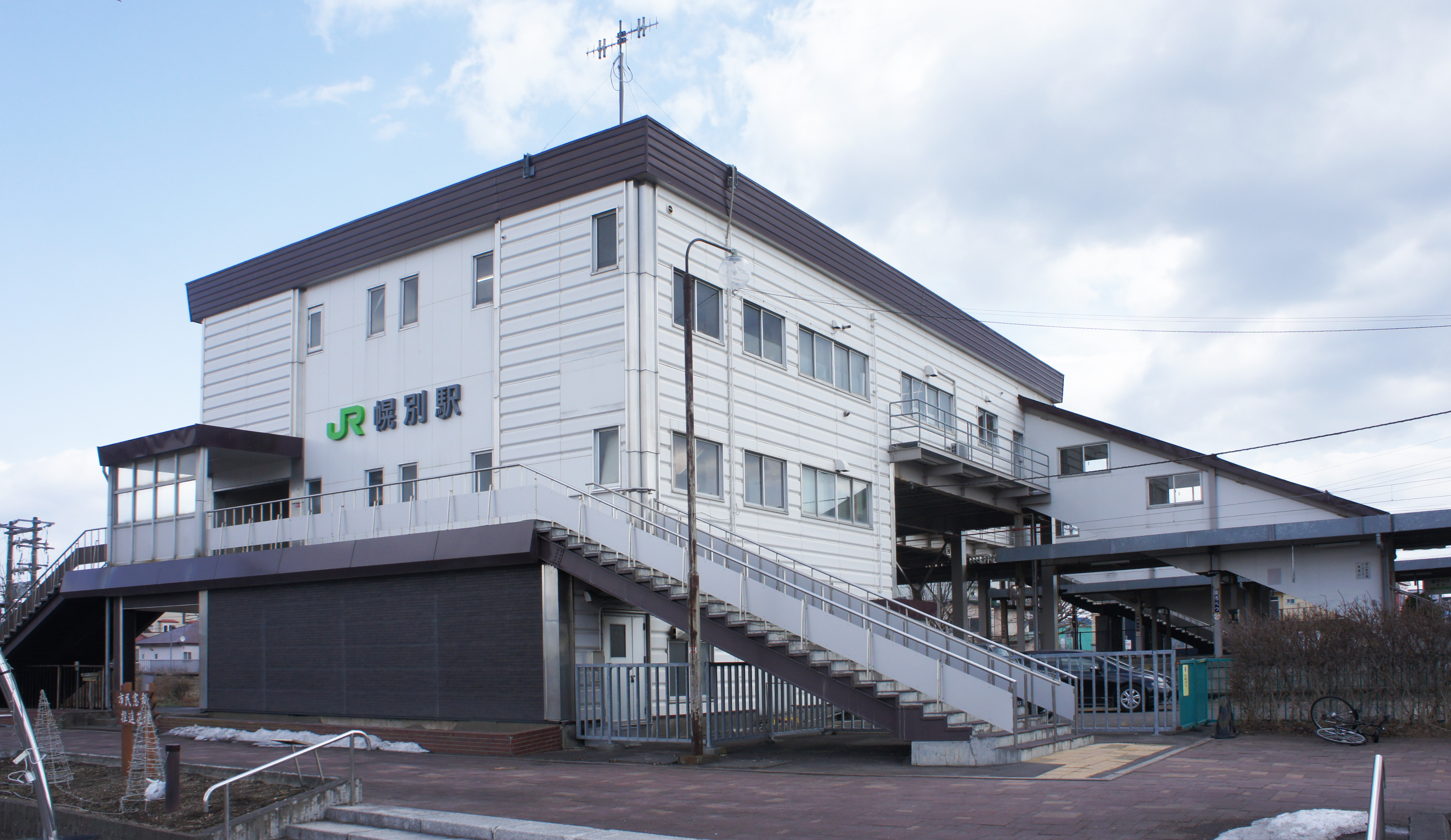

General information
- Location: Noboribetsu, Hokkaido; Japan
- Operator: JR Hokkaido
- Line: Muroran Main Line
- Platforms: 1 side + 1 island platforms
- Tracks: 3

Other information
- Status: Staffed
- Station code: H30

History
- Opened: Aug 1, 1892

Passengers
- 2019: 724 daily
Location

Horobetsu Station (幌別駅, Horobetsu-eki) is a railway station on the Muroran Main Line of Hokkaido Railway Company (JR Hokkaido) located in Noboribetsu, Hokkaidō, Japan. The station is assigned the station number H30.

The station was opened by Hokkaido Colliery and Railway Company on August 1, 1892 when the line between Higashi-Muroran Station and Iwamizawa Station opened.

Noboribetsu City Hall is located adjacent to Horobetsu Station.

== Adjacent stations ==
«	Service	»
Muroran Main Line
Limited Express Hokuto: Does not stop at this station
Washibetsu (H31)	Limited Express Suzuran	Noboribetsu (H28)
Washibetsu	Local	Tomiura
