= Washibetsu Station =

Railway station in Muroran, Hokkaido, Japan

Coordinates: 42.3600°N 141.0443°E

H31 Washibetsu Station 鷲別駅
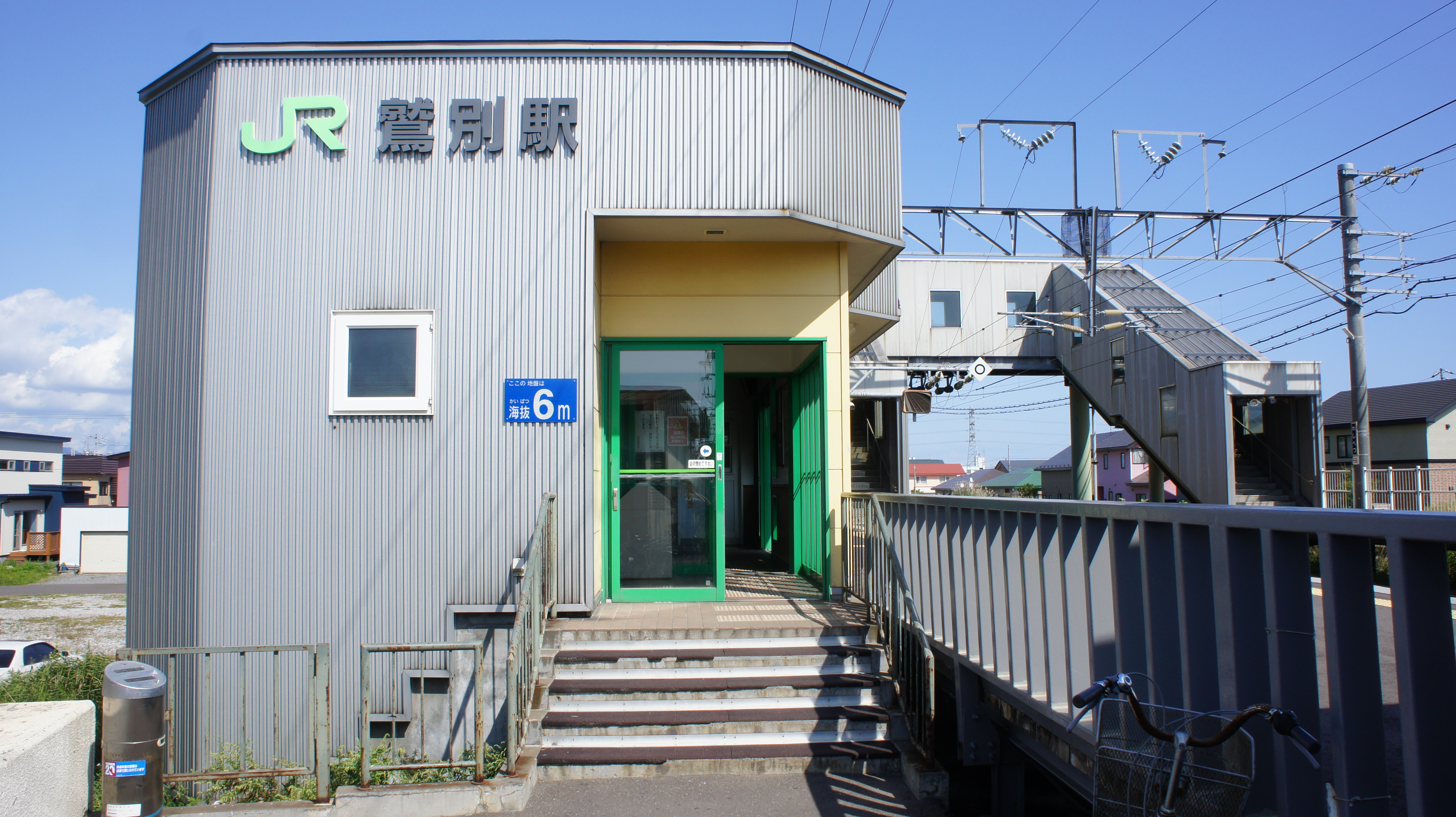

General information
- Location: Noboribetsu, Hokkaido; Japan
- Operator: JR Hokkaido
- Line: Muroran Main Line
- Platforms: 2 side platforms

Other information
- Status: Unstaffed
- Station code: H31

History
- Opened: Dec 1, 1901

Passengers
- 2014: 413 daily
Location

Washibetsu Station (鷲別駅, Washibetsu-eki) is a railway station on the Muroran Main Line of Hokkaido Railway Company (JR Hokkaido) located in Noboribetsu, Hokkaidō, Japan. The station is assigned the station number H31.

The station was opened by Hokkaido Colliery and Railway Company on December 1, 1901.

Washibetsu Locomotive Depot of Japan Freight Railway Company (JR Freight) is located nearby.

== Adjacent stations ==
«	Service	»
Muroran Main Line
Limited Express Hokuto: Does not stop at this station
Higashi-Muroran (H32)	Limited Express Suzuran	Horobetsu (H30)
Higashi-Muroran	Local	Horobetsu
