= Kita-Yoshihara Station =

Railway station in Shiraoi, Hokkaido, Japan

Coordinates: 42.5092°N 141.2860°E

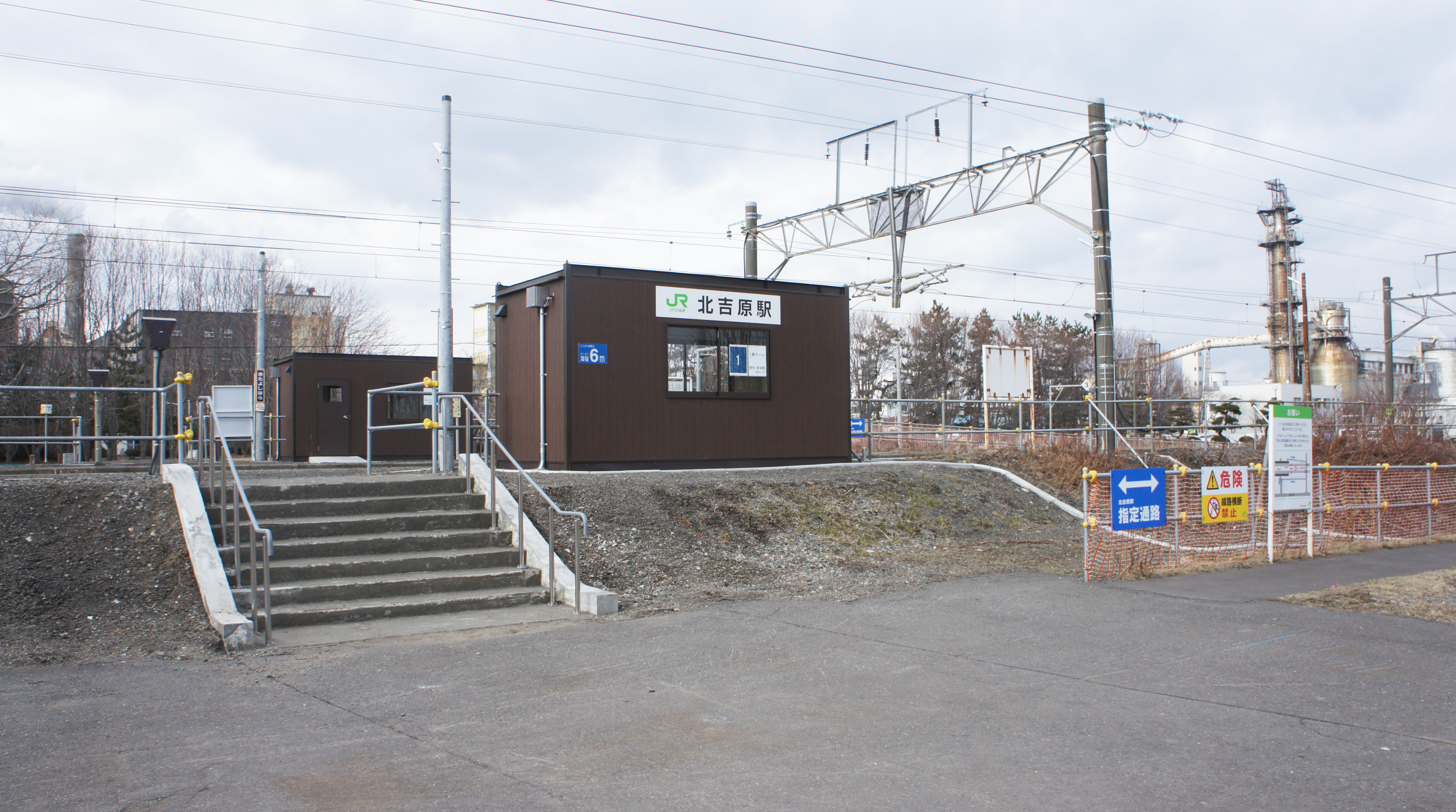
Kita-Yoshihara Station.

Kita-Yoshihara Station (北吉原駅, Kita-Yoshihara-eki) is a railway station on the Muroran Main Line of Hokkaido Railway Company located in Shiraoi, Hokkaidō, Japan.

== Adjacent stations ==
«	Service	»
Muroran Main Line
Takeura	-	Hagino
