= Noboribetsu =

Noboribetsu 登別市
- City
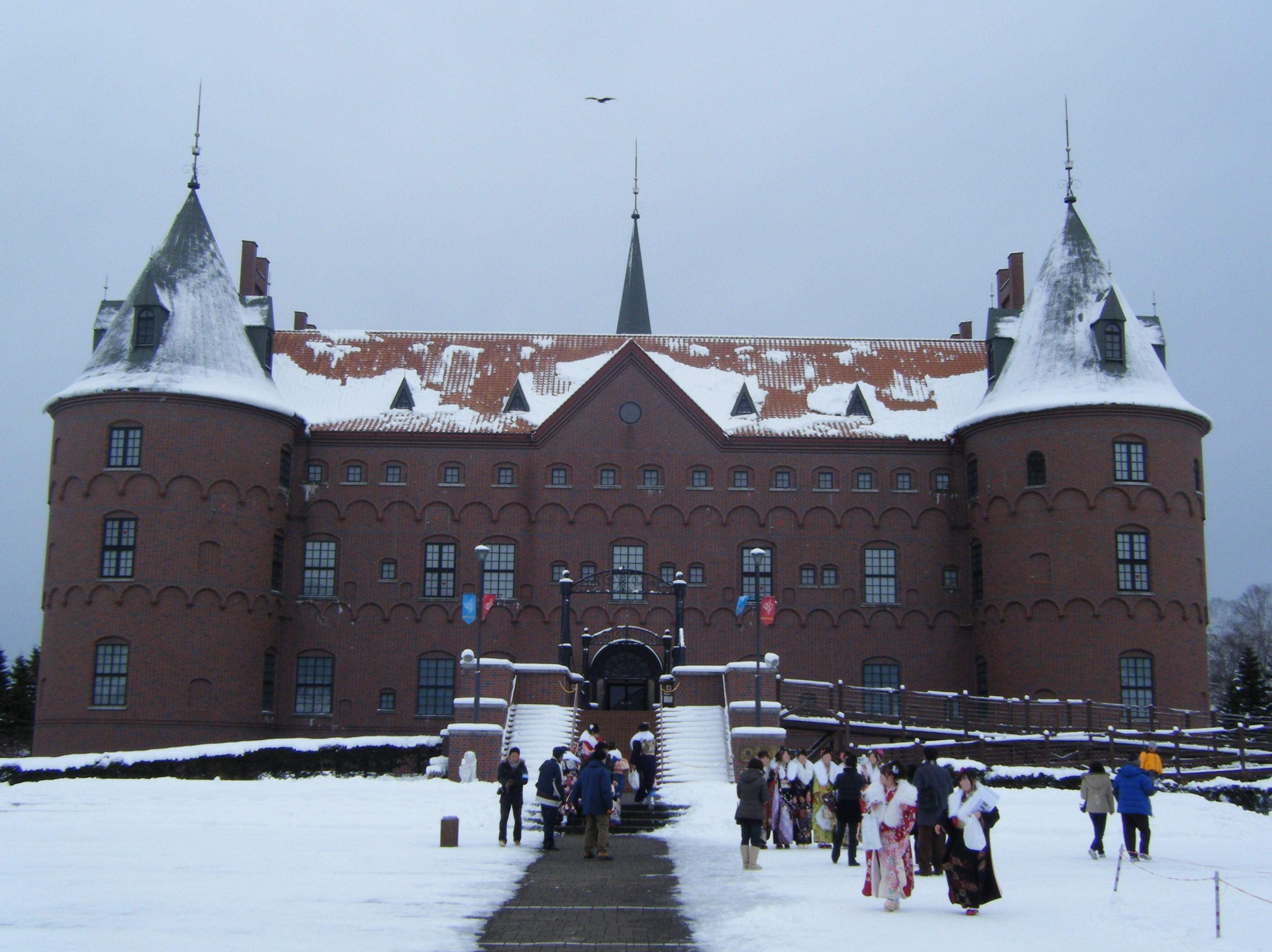
- View of Noboribetsu Marine Park Nixe, with aquarium

- Flag Chapter

- Location of Noboribetsu in Hokkaido (Iburi Subprefecture)

- Location in Japan
- Coordinates: 42°25′N 141°6′E
- Country: Japan
- Region: Hokkaido
- Prefecture: Hokkaido (Iburi Subprefecture)

Government
  - Mayor: Haruichi Ogasawara

Area
  - Total: 212.11 km^{2} (81.90 sq mi)

Population (30 September 2016)
  - Total: 49,523
  - Density: 233.48/km^{2} (604.71/sq mi)
- Time zone: UTC+09:00 (JST)
- City hall address: 6–11 Chūōchō, Noboribetsu-shi, Hokkaidō; 059-8701
- Climate: Dfb
- Website: www.city.noboribetsu.lg.jp
- Symbols
- Flower: Chrysanthemum
- Tree: Platanus

Noboribetsu (登別市, Noboribetsu-shi; Ainu: nupur-pet) is a city in Iburi Subprefecture, Hokkaido, Japan. Part of Shikotsu-Toya National Park, it is southwest of Sapporo, west of Tomakomai and northeast of Hakodate.

As of September 2016, the city has an estimated population of 49,523 and a population density of 230 persons per km^{2}. The total area is 212.11 km^{2}. The city office is in Horobetsu. The town of Noboribetsu is at the mouth of the Noboribetsu river and is therefore a much narrower area.

== Geography ==
The mountains dominate the west and north while the plains dominate around five km within the coastline. There are three towns along the Pacific Ocean: from northeast to southwest, Noboribetsu, Horobetsu and Washibetsu. These betsu are derived from "river" in the Ainu language. Noboribetsu is on the Noboribetsu River. Horobetsu and Washibetsu are on the Iburi-horobetsu River and the Washibetsu River respectively.

=== Origin of name ===
The name, Noboribetsu, derives from an Ainu word, nupur-pet, which means "dark-colored river"; the kanji 登別, meaning "climbing different", are used for their phonetic value only, and have no relation to the original meaning.

== Climate ==
Climate data for Noboribetsu (elevation 197 m, 1991–2020 normals, extremes 1977–present)
Month	Jan	Feb	Mar	Apr	May	Jun	Jul	Aug	Sep	Oct	Nov	Dec	Year
Record high °C (°F)	9.1 (48.4)	11.4 (52.5)	15.0 (59.0)	23.5 (74.3)	29.4 (84.9)	29.9 (85.8)	34.3 (93.7)	32.4 (90.3)	30.3 (86.5)	26.2 (79.2)	21.0 (69.8)	12.9 (55.2)	34.3 (93.7)
Mean daily maximum °C (°F)	−1.2 (29.8)	−0.6 (30.9)	3.0 (37.4)	9.3 (48.7)	15.0 (59.0)	18.3 (64.9)	21.7 (71.1)	23.3 (73.9)	20.9 (69.6)	15.0 (59.0)	7.8 (46.0)	1.0 (33.8)	11.1 (52.0)
Daily mean °C (°F)	−4.1 (24.6)	−3.8 (25.2)	−0.4 (31.3)	5.1 (41.2)	10.3 (50.5)	14.0 (57.2)	17.9 (64.2)	19.6 (67.3)	16.7 (62.1)	10.8 (51.4)	4.2 (39.6)	−1.9 (28.6)	7.4 (45.3)
Mean daily minimum °C (°F)	−7.3 (18.9)	−7.2 (19.0)	−3.8 (25.2)	1.2 (34.2)	6.1 (43.0)	10.4 (50.7)	15.0 (59.0)	16.6 (61.9)	12.8 (55.0)	6.5 (43.7)	0.6 (33.1)	−4.9 (23.2)	3.8 (38.8)
Record low °C (°F)	−18.1 (−0.6)	−19.4 (−2.9)	−14.5 (5.9)	−8.5 (16.7)	−2.0 (28.4)	0.1 (32.2)	6.7 (44.1)	7.7 (45.9)	2.9 (37.2)	−2.1 (28.2)	−9.9 (14.2)	−14.1 (6.6)	−19.4 (−2.9)
Average precipitation mm (inches)	53.8 (2.12)	53.5 (2.11)	75.8 (2.98)	110.1 (4.33)	167.0 (6.57)	183.0 (7.20)	251.7 (9.91)	297.9 (11.73)	259.3 (10.21)	176.1 (6.93)	113.2 (4.46)	70.0 (2.76)	1,811.2 (71.31)
Average snowfall cm (inches)	127 (50)	117 (46)	94 (37)	19 (7.5)	0 (0)	0 (0)	0 (0)	0 (0)	0 (0)	0 (0)	11 (4.3)	82 (32)	454 (179)
Average precipitation days (≥ 1.0 mm)	9.4	9.4	10.8	10.4	11.2	11.0	14.2	14.6	12.9	12.5	12.4	10.8	139.5
Mean monthly sunshine hours	109.6	114.1	157.6	185.7	192.8	142.8	111.4	125.4	150.1	157.7	117.4	101.9	1,666.5
Source: Japan Meteorological Agency (1991–2020 normals, extremes 1977–present)

== History ==
- 1919: Horobetsu village was founded.
- 1951: Horobetsu village became Horobetsu town.
- 1961: Horobetsu town renamed to Noboribetsu town.
- 1970: Noboribetsu town became Noboribetsu city.

== Education ==
=== High school ===
- Hokkaido Noboribetsu Seiryo High School (登別市立西陵中学校)

=== Secondary school ===
- Hokkaido Noboribetsu Akebi Secondary School (北海道登別明日中等教育学校)

== Transportation ==
- Muroran Main Line: Washibetsu – Horobetsu – Tomiura – Noboribetsu
- Hokkaido Expressway: Noboribetsu-Muroran IC – Tomiura PA – Noboribetsu-Higashi IC
- Route 36

== Sightseeing ==
Jigokudani, or Hell Valley, the main source of the Noboribetsu onsen

6 km inland from Noboribetsu City in the river valley is the smaller town of Noboribetsu-onsen (登別温泉). The town has a range of onsen for bathing as well as other hot springs formed from different minerals for scenic viewing, and is also known for its bear park. Noboribetsu-onsen is one of many well-known resorts in Japan, with many hotels and ryokan, and is the largest "hot spring town" in Hokkaido. There is also the Noboribetsu Marine Park Nixe, the largest aquarium in Hokkaido.

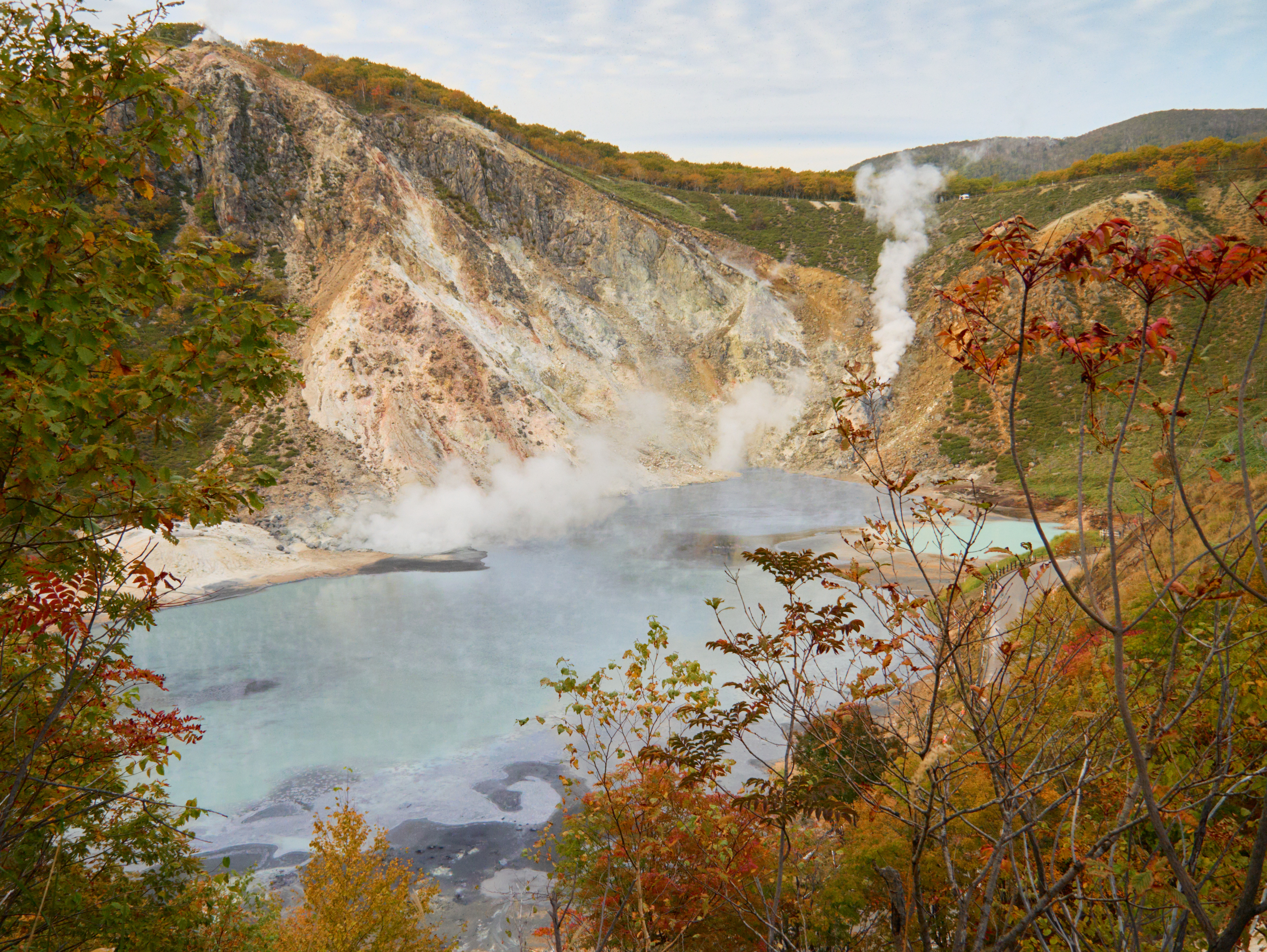
Oyunuma, in autumn.

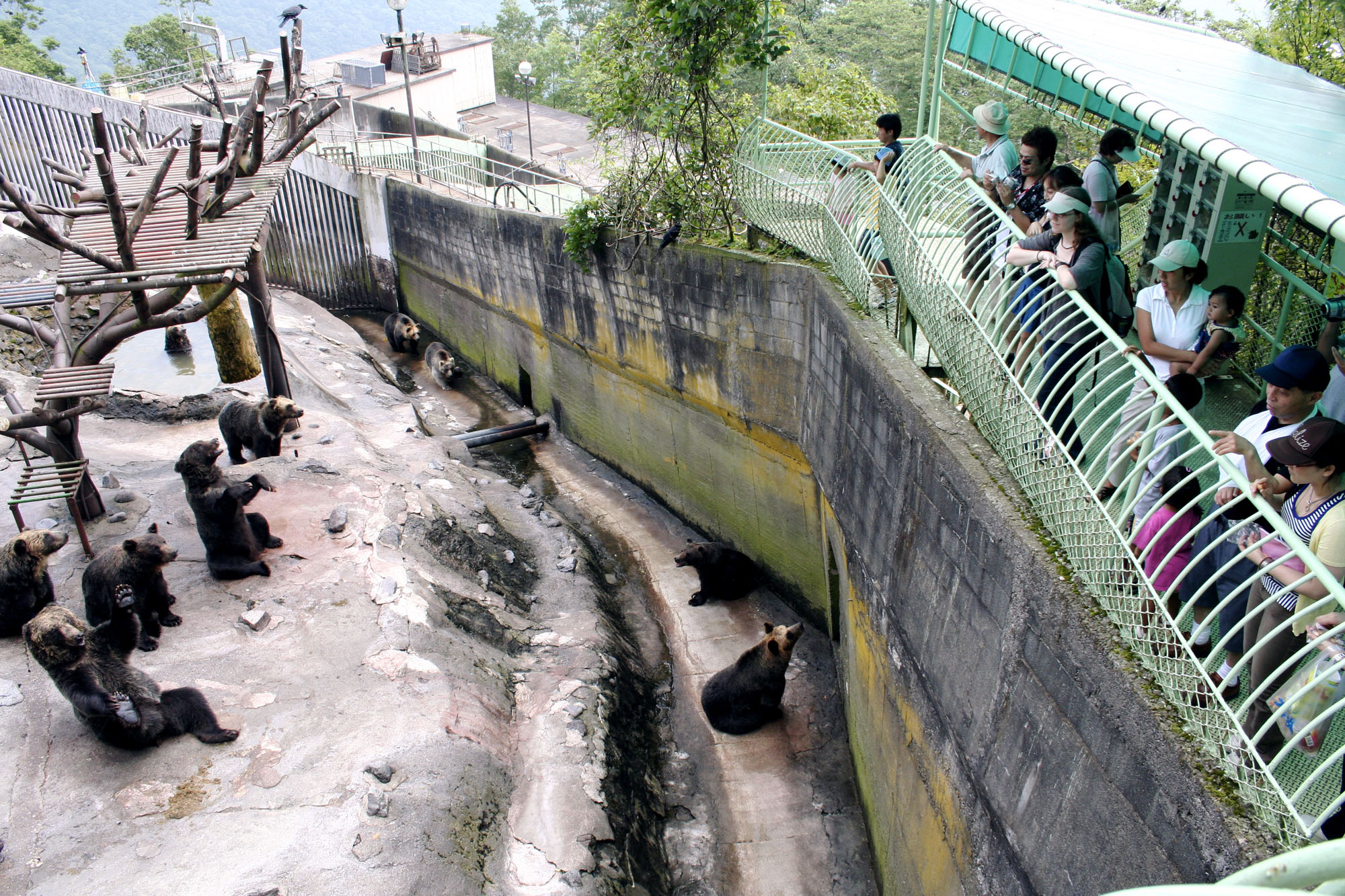
Noboribetsu Bear Park

== Sister cities ==
=== International ===
- Faaborg-Midtfyn Municipality, Denmark
- Saipan, United States
- Guangzhou, Guangdong, China

=== Domestic ===
- (Japan) Shiroishi, Miyagi
- (Japan) Ebina, Kanagawa

== Notable people from Noboribetsu ==
- Yukie Chiri, Ainu transcriber and translator of Yukar (Ainu epic tales)
- Toma Ikuta, Japanese actor (Hanazakari no Kimitachi e, Honey & Clover, Sensei!, Ouroboros, Hanamizuki and Ningen Shikkaku)
- Masayuki Kono, Japanese professional wrestler and former mixed martial artist
- Kazuki Kushibiki, Japanese football player
- Samizu Matsuki, artist, classical realism painting, drawing, emigre.
- Takashi Narita, former volleyball player
- Rina Sumioka, Japanese female singer-songwriter and J-pop idol
- Yoshida Brothers, Japanese shamisenist musicians
