= Noboribetsu Station =

Railway station in Noboribetsu, Hokkaido, Japan

H28 Noboribetsu Station 登別駅
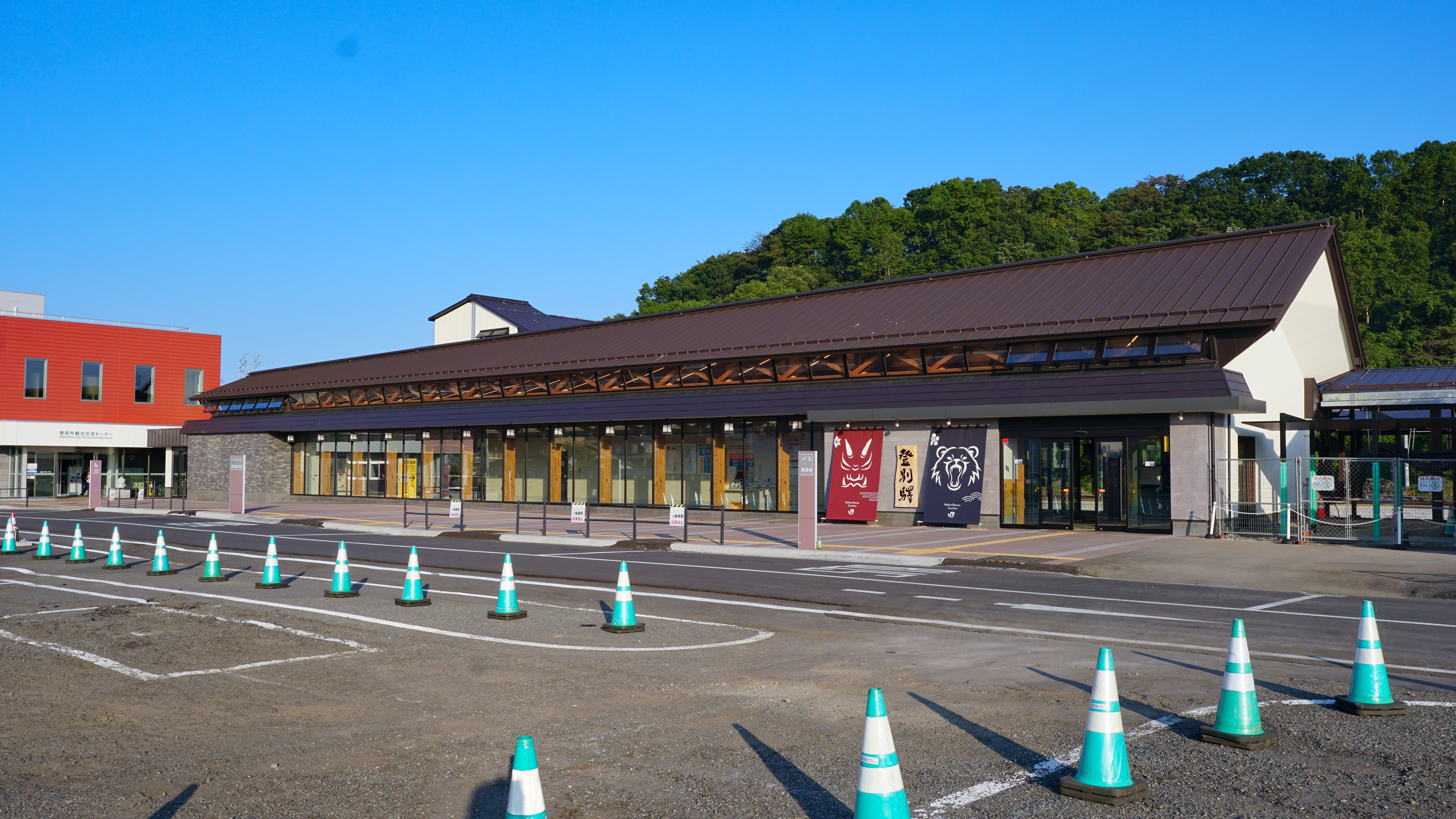
- Noboribetsu Station forecourt in August 2026

General information
- Location: Noboribetsu, Hokkaido; Japan
- Coordinates: 42°27′7.5″N 141°10′49.6″E
- Operator: JR Hokkaido
- Line: Muroran Main Line
- Platforms: 1 side + 1 island platform
- Tracks: 4
- Connections: Bus

Construction
- Structure type: At grade

Other information
- Status: Staffed
- Station code: H28
- Website: Official website

History
- Opened: 1 August 1892; 134 years ago

Passengers
- 2019: 384 daily

Services
Preceding station	JR Hokkaido	Following station
Tomiura towards Oshamambe	Muroran Main Line Local	Kojōhama towards Iwamizawa
Higashi-Muroran towards Hakodate	Hokuto	Shiraoi towards Sapporo
Horobetsu towards Higashi-Muroran	Suzuran	Shiraoi towards Sapporo
Location
- Location within Hokkaido Location within Japan

Noboribetsu Station (登別駅, Noboribetsu-eki) is a railway station on the Muroran Main Line in Noboribetsu, Hokkaido, Japan, operated by Hokkaido Railway Company (JR Hokkaido). The station is numbered "H28".

== Lines ==
Noboribetsu Station is served by the Muroran Main Line.

== Station layout ==
The station has one side platform and one island platform, serving three tracks, with an additional through track between platforms 1 and 2.

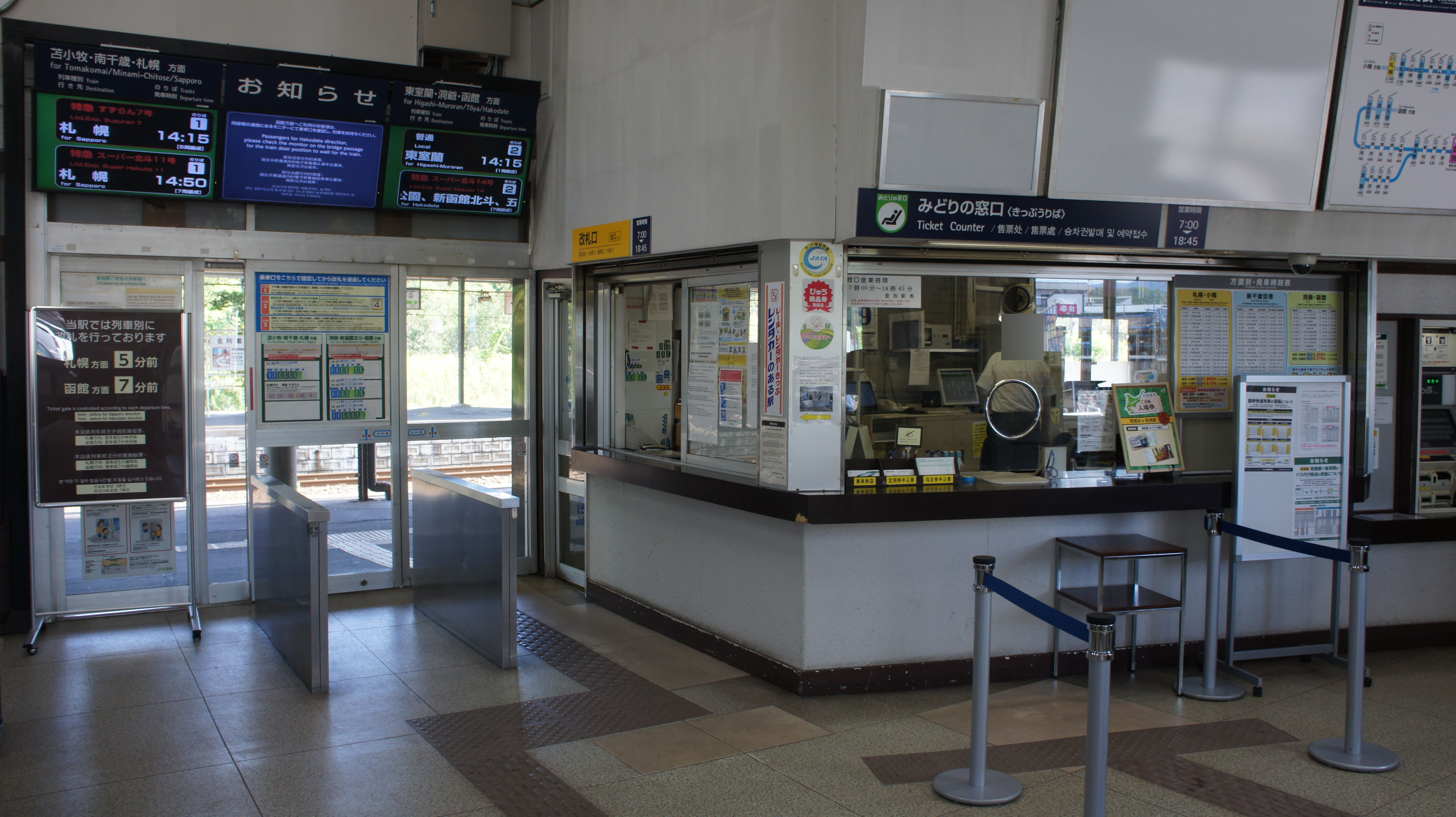
Noboribetsu Station concourse in September 2017

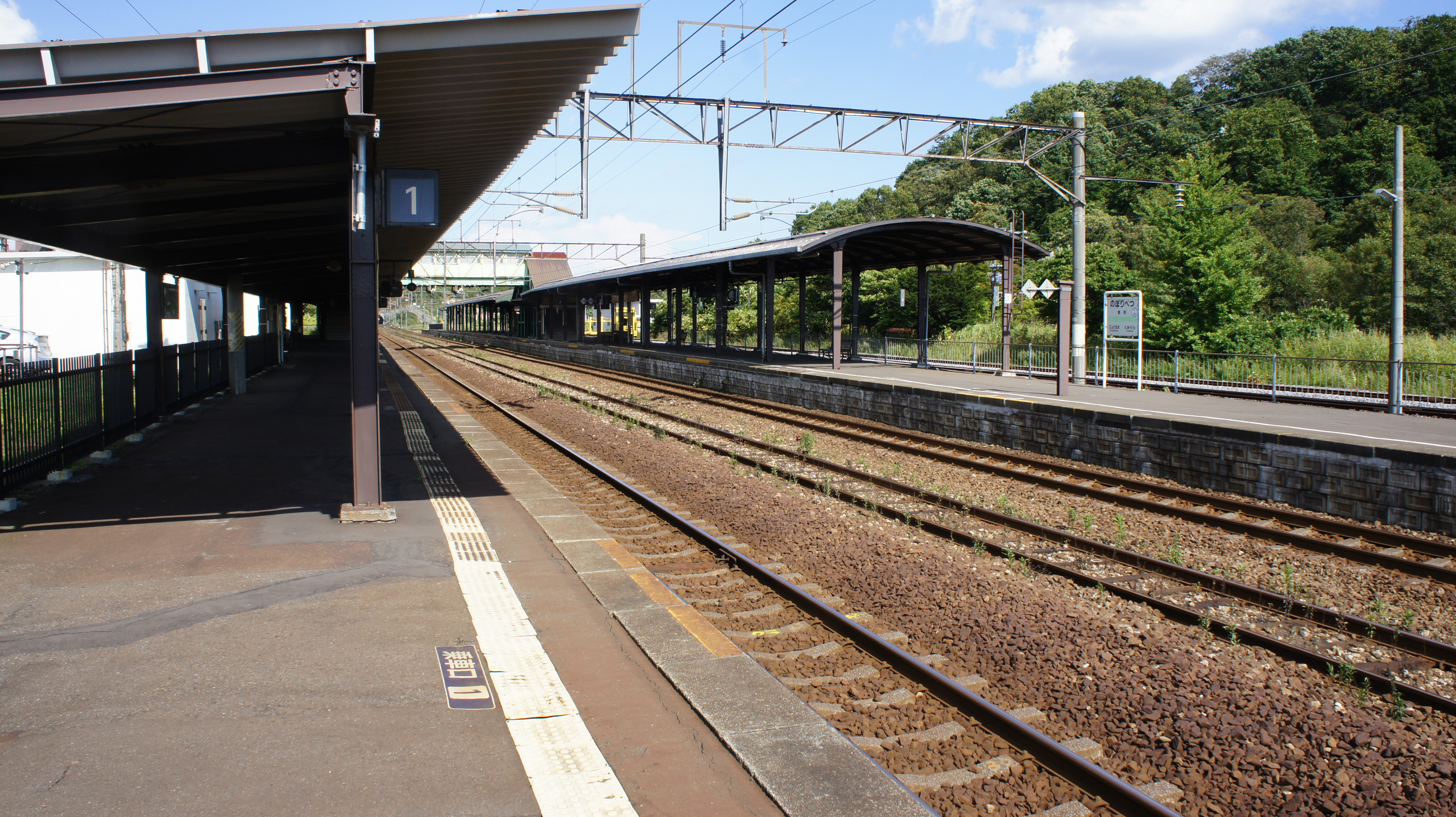
The platforms in September 2017

== History ==
The station was opened by the Hokkaido Colliery and Railway Company on August 1, 1892, when the line between Higashi-Muroran Station and Iwamizawa Station opened.

== Surrounding area ==
The station is a gateway to the Noboribetsu Onsen hot spring area, which is connected by a 15-minute bus ride from the station.

== See also ==
- List of railway stations in Japan
