= Takeura Station =

Railway station in Shiraoi, Hokkaido, Japan

Coordinates: 42.4922°N 141.2599°E

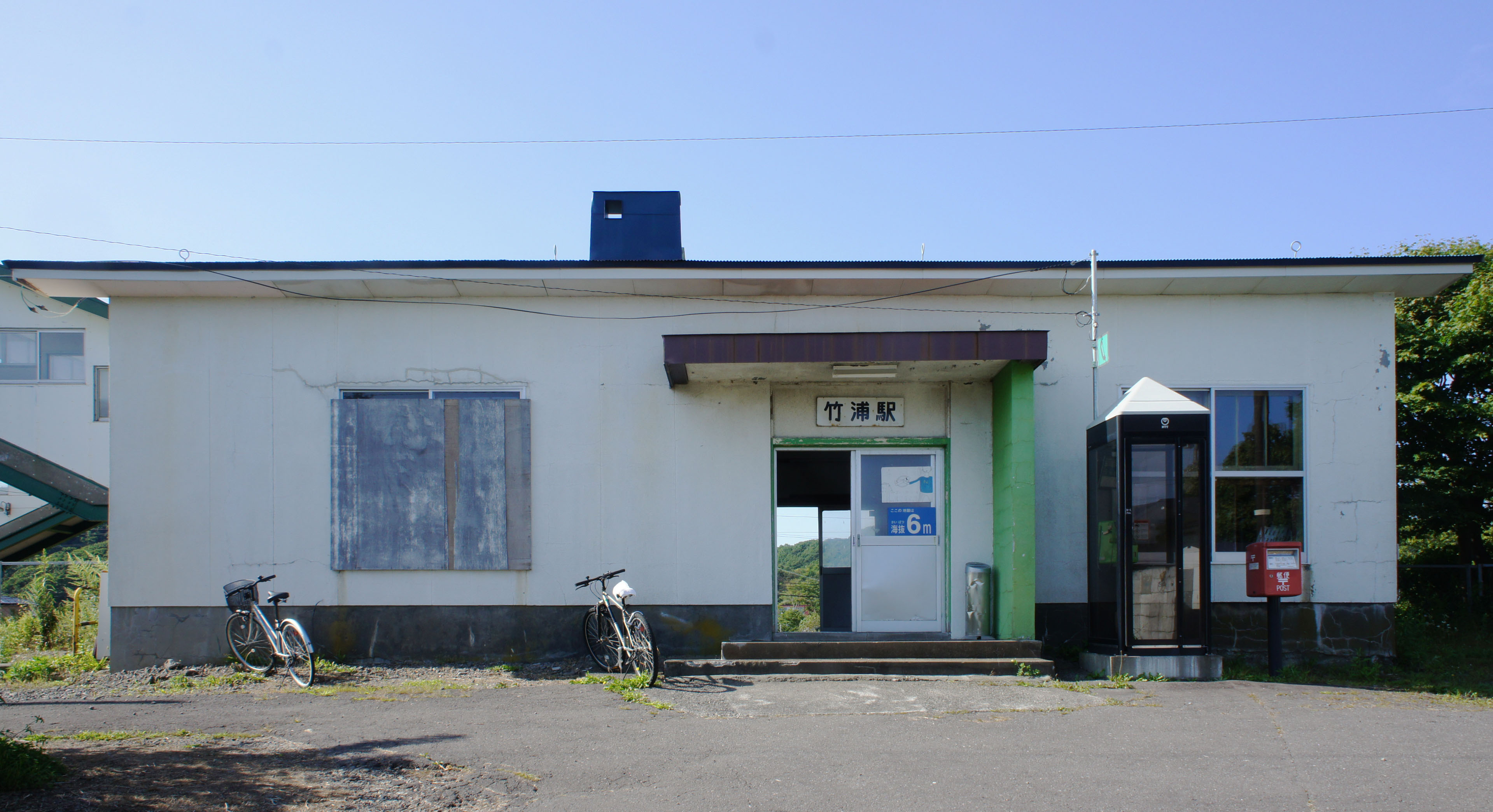
Station building

Takeura Station (竹浦駅, Takeura-eki) is a railway station on the Muroran Main Line of Hokkaido Railway Company located in Shiraoi, Hokkaidō, Japan.

== Adjacent stations ==
«	Service	»
Muroran Main Line
Kojōhama	-	Kita-Yoshihara
