= Tomakomai Station =

Railway station in Tomakomai, Hokkaido, Japan

Coordinates: 42.6394363°N 141.5969467°E

H18 Tomakomai Station 苫小牧駅
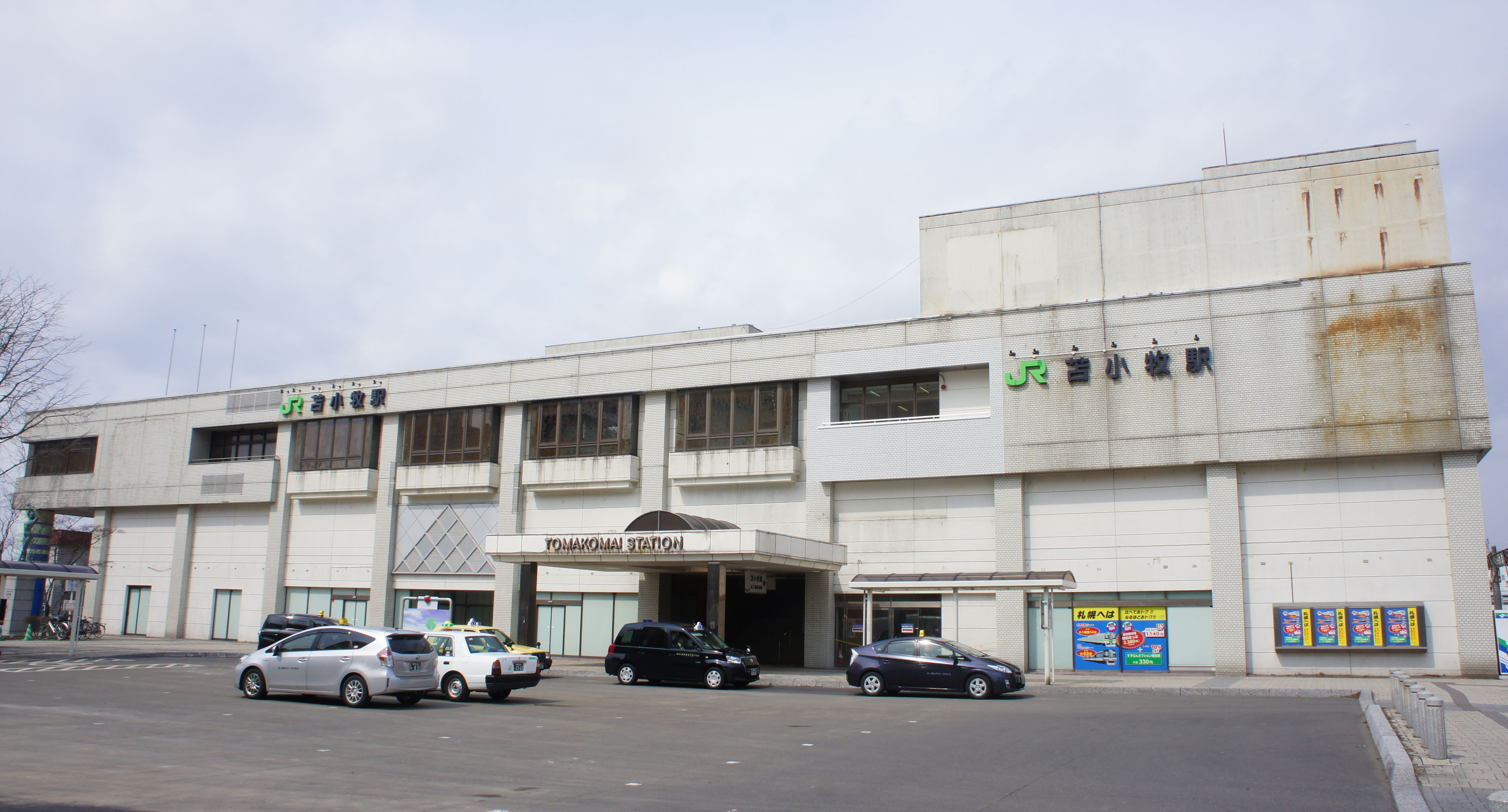
- Tomakomai Station

General information
- Location: 6-4-3 Omotemachi, Tomakomai; Hokkaido Prefecture; Japan
- Operator: JR Hokkaido
- Lines: Muroran Main Line; Chitose Line
- Platforms: 2 island platforms
- Tracks: 4

Construction
- Structure type: At grade

Other information
- Station code: H18

History
- Opened: 1 August 1892; 134 years ago

Services
Preceding station	JR Hokkaido	Following station
Aoba towards Oshamambe	Muroran Main Line Local	Numanohata towards Iwamizawa
Terminus	Chitose Line Local	Numanohata towards Sapporo
Terminus	Hidaka Main Line	Yūfutsu towards Mukawa
Limited Express
Shiraoi towards Hakodate	Hokuto	Minami-Chitose towards Sapporo
Shiraoi towards Higashi-Muroran	Suzuran	Numanohata towards Sapporo
Location
- Location within Hokkaido Location within Japan

Tomakomai Station (苫小牧駅, Tomakomai-eki) is a railway station in Tomakomai, Hokkaido, Japan, operated by the Hokkaido Railway Company (JR Hokkaido).

== Lines ==
Tomakomai Station is served by the following lines.

- Muroran Main Line
  - Chitose Line
- Hidaka Main Line

== Limited express trains ==
- Hokuto (Sapporo - Hakodate)
- Suzuran (Sapporo - Muroran)

The Following Services have Discontinued

- Cassiopeia (Ueno - Sapporo)
- Hokutosei (Ueno - Sapporo)

== Station layout ==
- Above-ground station with two platforms serving four tracks.

== History ==
The station opened on 1 August 1892.
