= Wanishi Station =

Railway station in Muroran, Hokkaido, Japan

Coordinates: 42.3339°N 141.0053°E

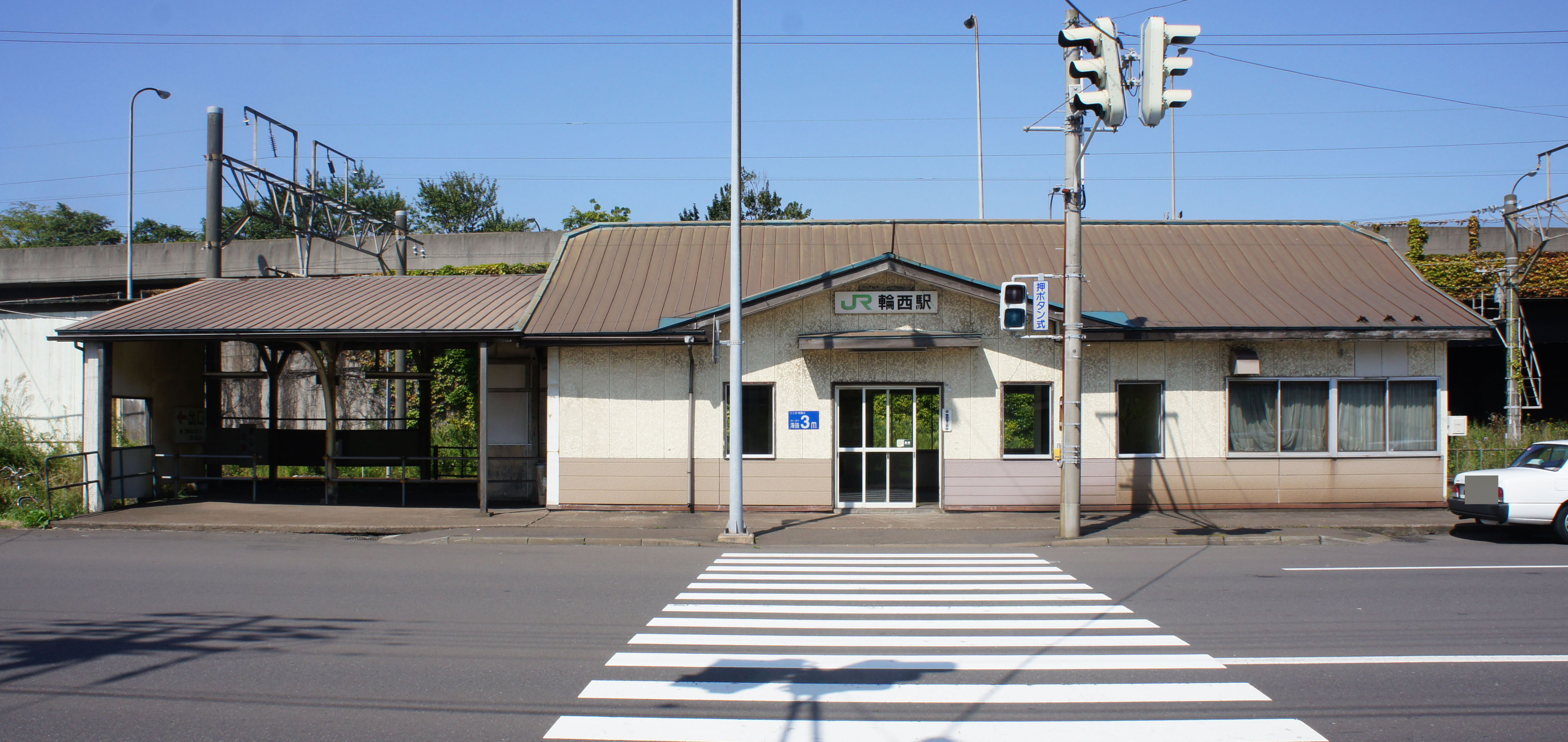
JR Muroran-Main-Line Wanishi Station building

Wanishi Station (輪西駅, Wanishi-eki) is a train station in Muroran, Hokkaidō, Japan.

== Lines ==
- Hokkaido Railway Company
  - Muroran Main Line Station M33

== Adjacent stations ==
«	Service	»
Muroran Main Line
Higashi-Muroran	-	Misaki
