= Muroran Station =

Railway station in Muroran, Hokkaido, Japan

M36 Muroran Station 室蘭駅
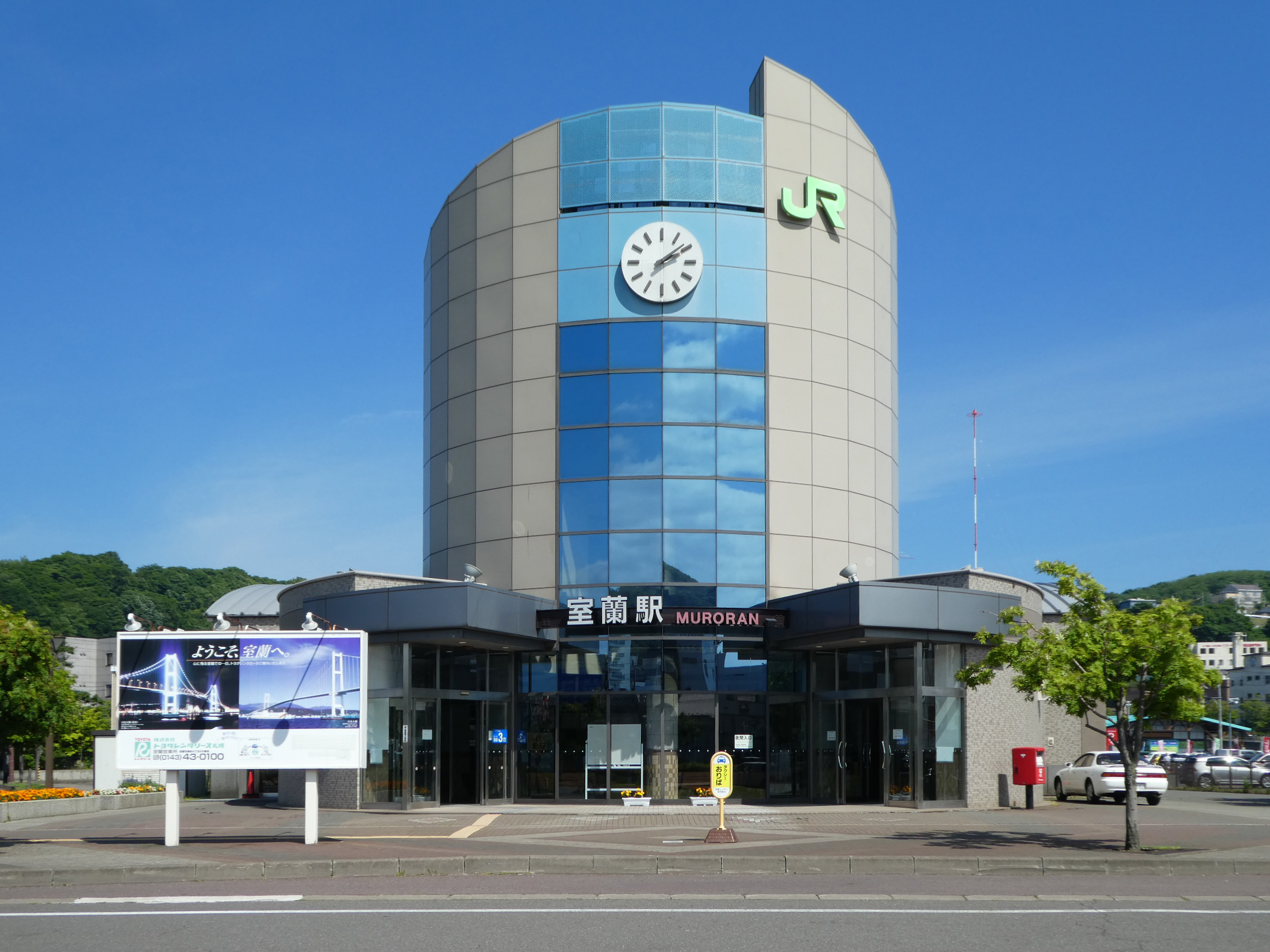
- Muroran Station entrance in July 2017

General information
- Location: Muroran, Hokkaido; Japan
- Coordinates: 42.3181°N 140.9756°E
- Operator: JR Hokkaido
- Line: ■ Muroran Main Line
- Distance: 7.0 km from Higashi-Muroran
- Tracks: 2

Other information
- Station code: M36
- Website: Official website

History
- Opened: 1 July 1897
- Rebuilt: 1 October 1997
Location
- Location within Hokkaido

Muroran Station (室蘭駅, Muroran-eki) is a railway station on the Muroran Main Line in Muroran, Hokkaido, Japan, operated by the Hokkaido Railway Company (JR Hokkaido).

== Lines ==
Muroran Station forms the terminus of the 7.0 km (4.3 mi) Muroran Main Line branch from Higashi-Muroran.

== Station layout ==
The station consists of a single island platform serving two terminating tracks.

=== Platforms ===
1/2	■ Muroran Main Line	for Higashi-Muroran, Tomakomai, Sapporo, and Oshamambe

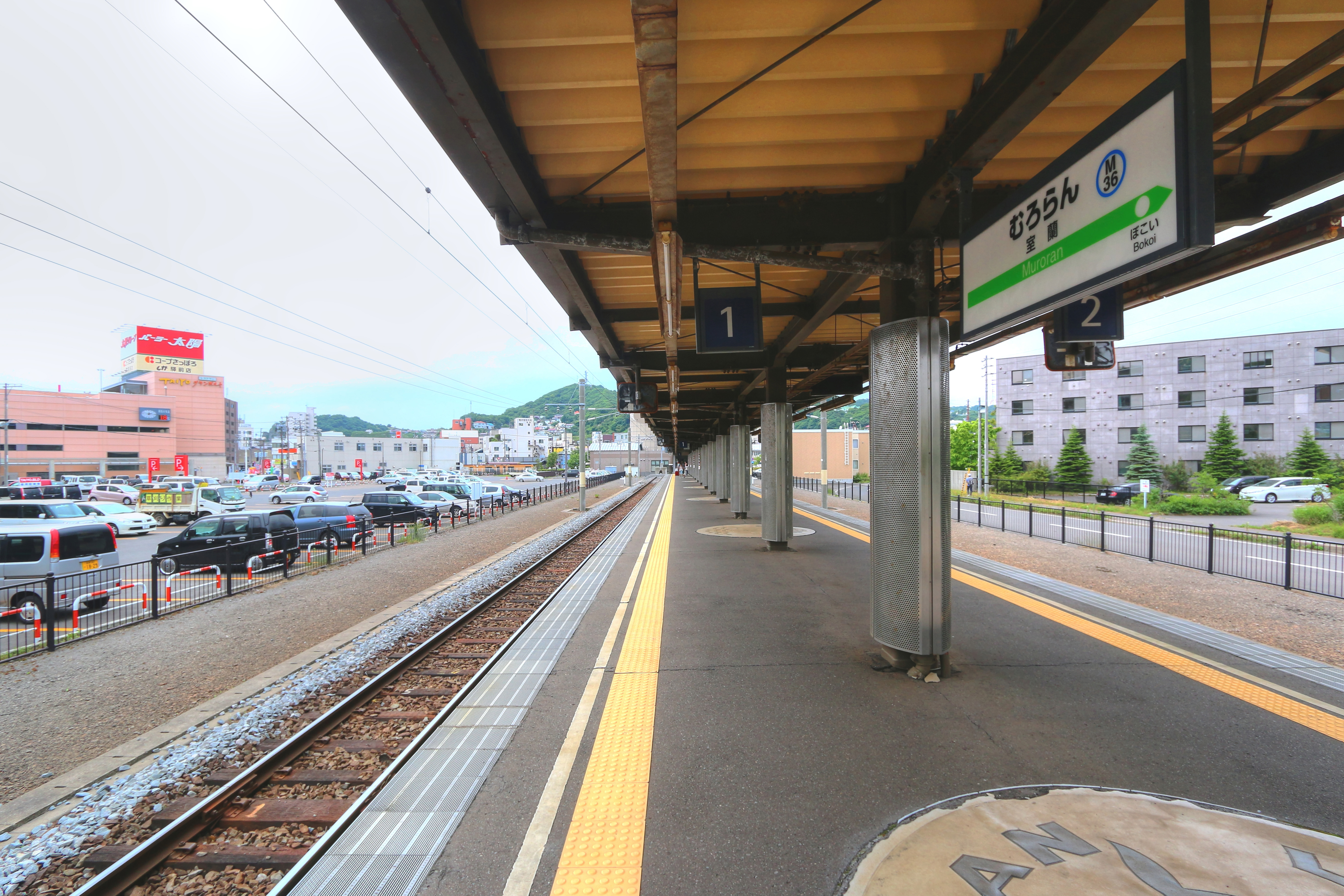
The platforms in July 2014

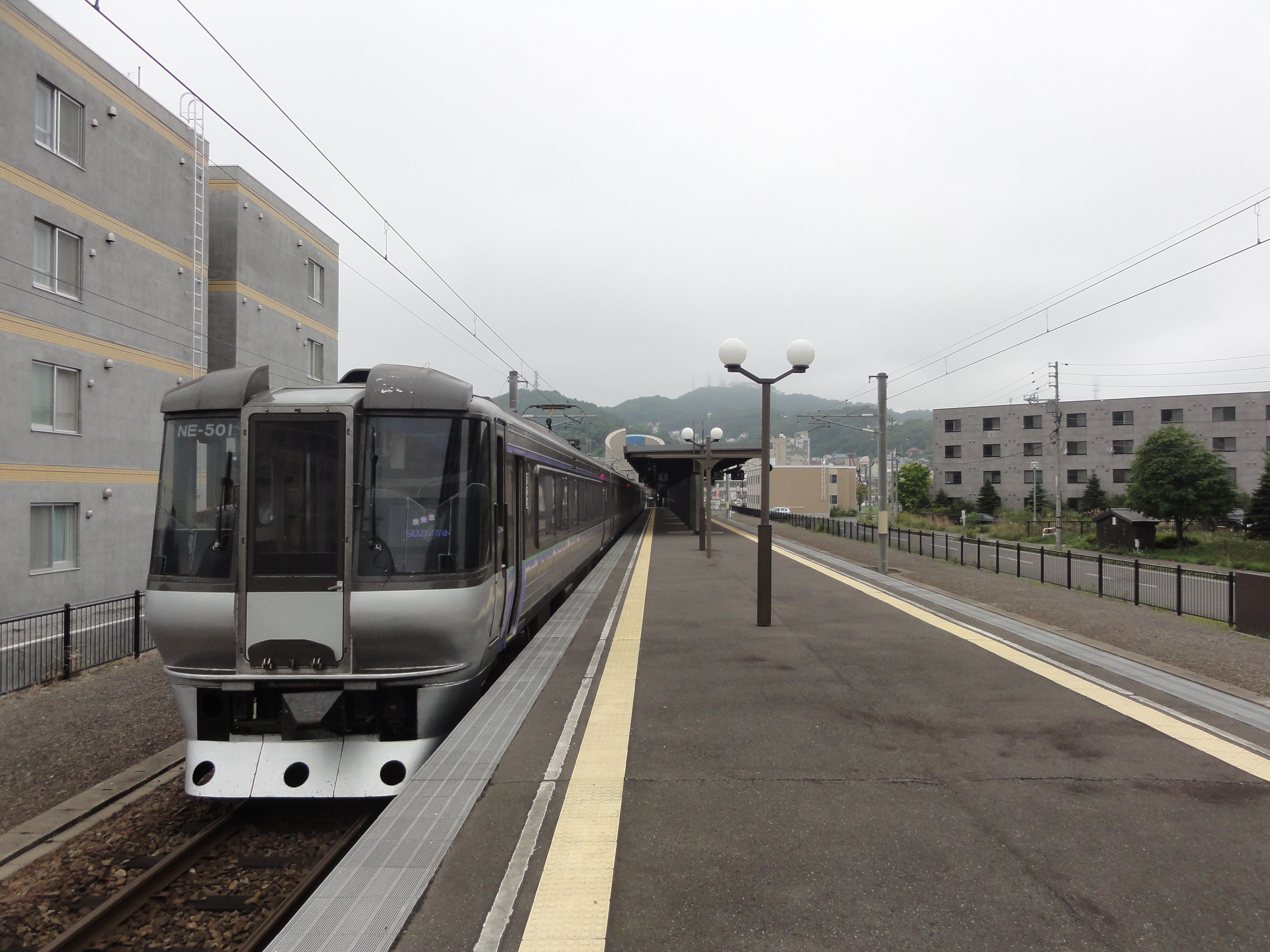
The platforms in September 2012
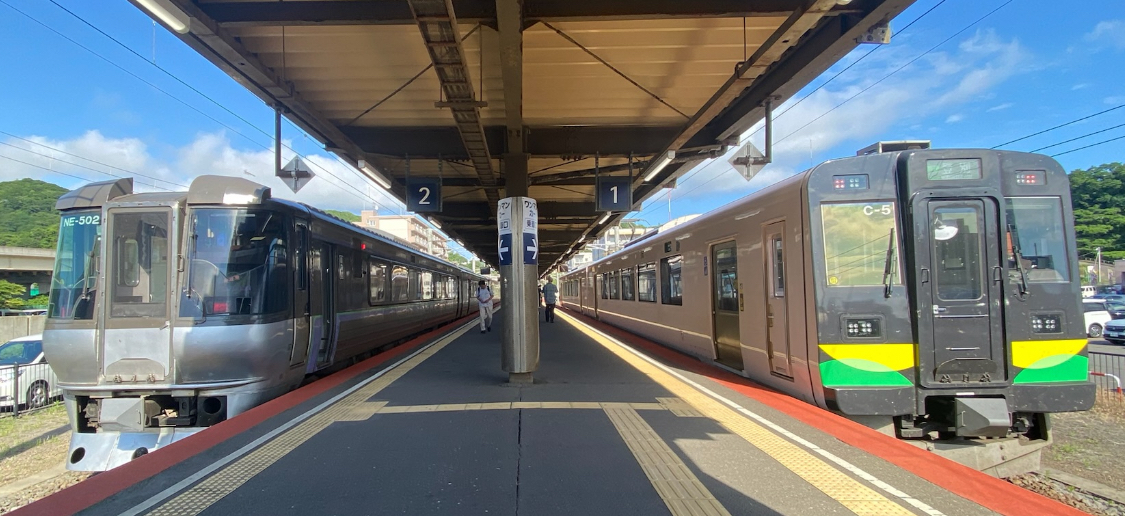
The Platforms in July 2025 (left is 785 series & right is 737 series)

== Adjacent stations ==
«	Service	»
Muroran Main Line
Bokoi	Local	Terminus

== History ==
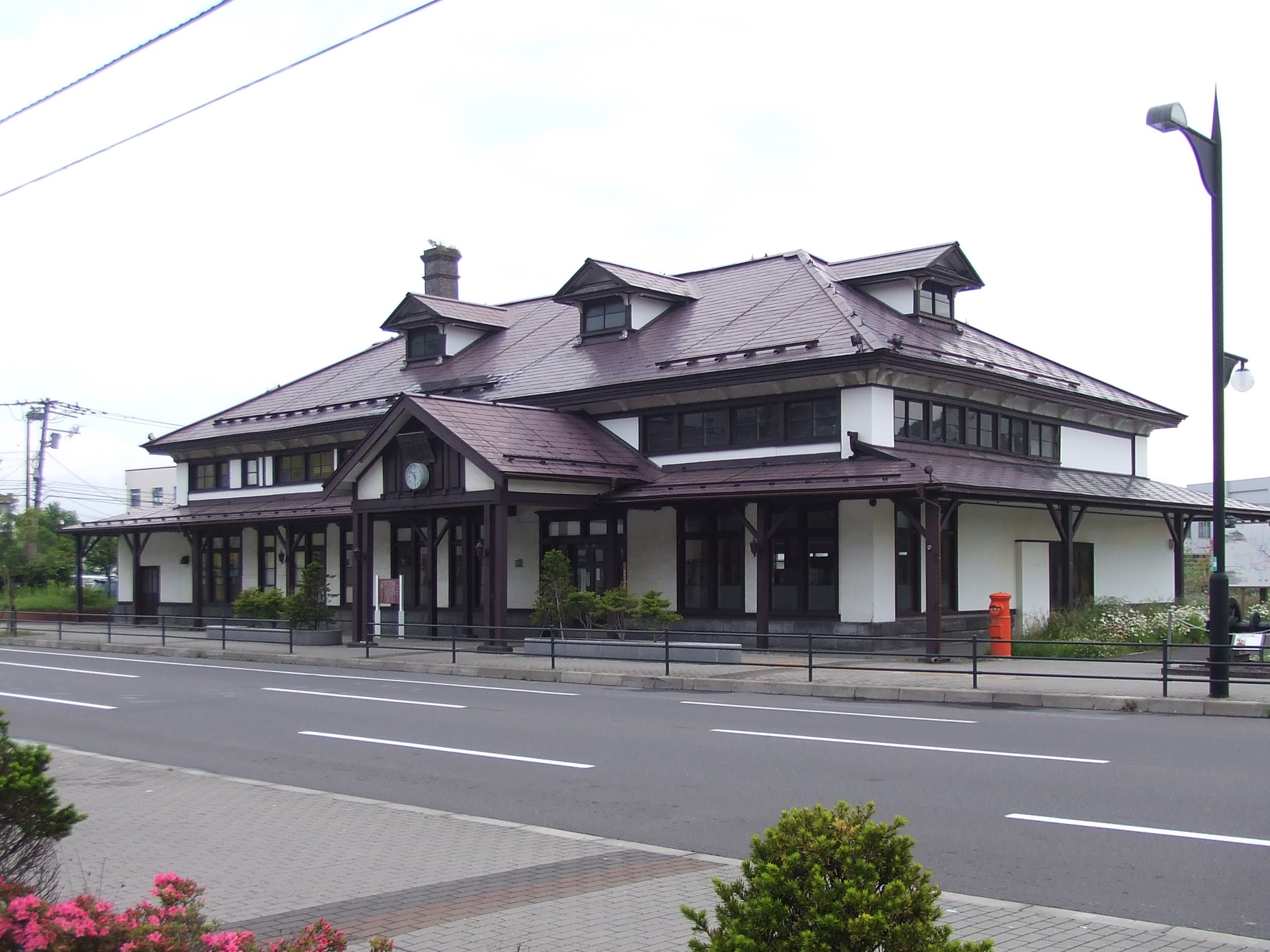
The former Muroran Station building in June 2007

The station opened on 1 July 1897. With the privatization of Japanese National Railways (JNR) on 1 April 1987, the station came under the control of JR Hokkaido.

The station was moved to its current location, 1.1 km closer to Higashi-Muroran, on 1 October 1997.

The station's Midori no Madoguchi closed on September 30, 2024.

The station is unstaffed all day from October 1, 2024. (Note: "室蘭 | 駅の情報検索（時刻表・バリアフリー）| 鉄道・きっぷ | JR北海道- Hokkaido Railway Company". 北海道旅客鉄道.)

== Surrounding area ==
- Muroran City Hall
- Iburi Subprefecture
- Cape Chikiu

== See also ==
- List of railway stations in Japan
