= Tomiura Station (Hokkaido) =

Railway station in Noboribetsu, Hokkaido, Japan

Coordinates: 42°26′31″N 141°09′23″E

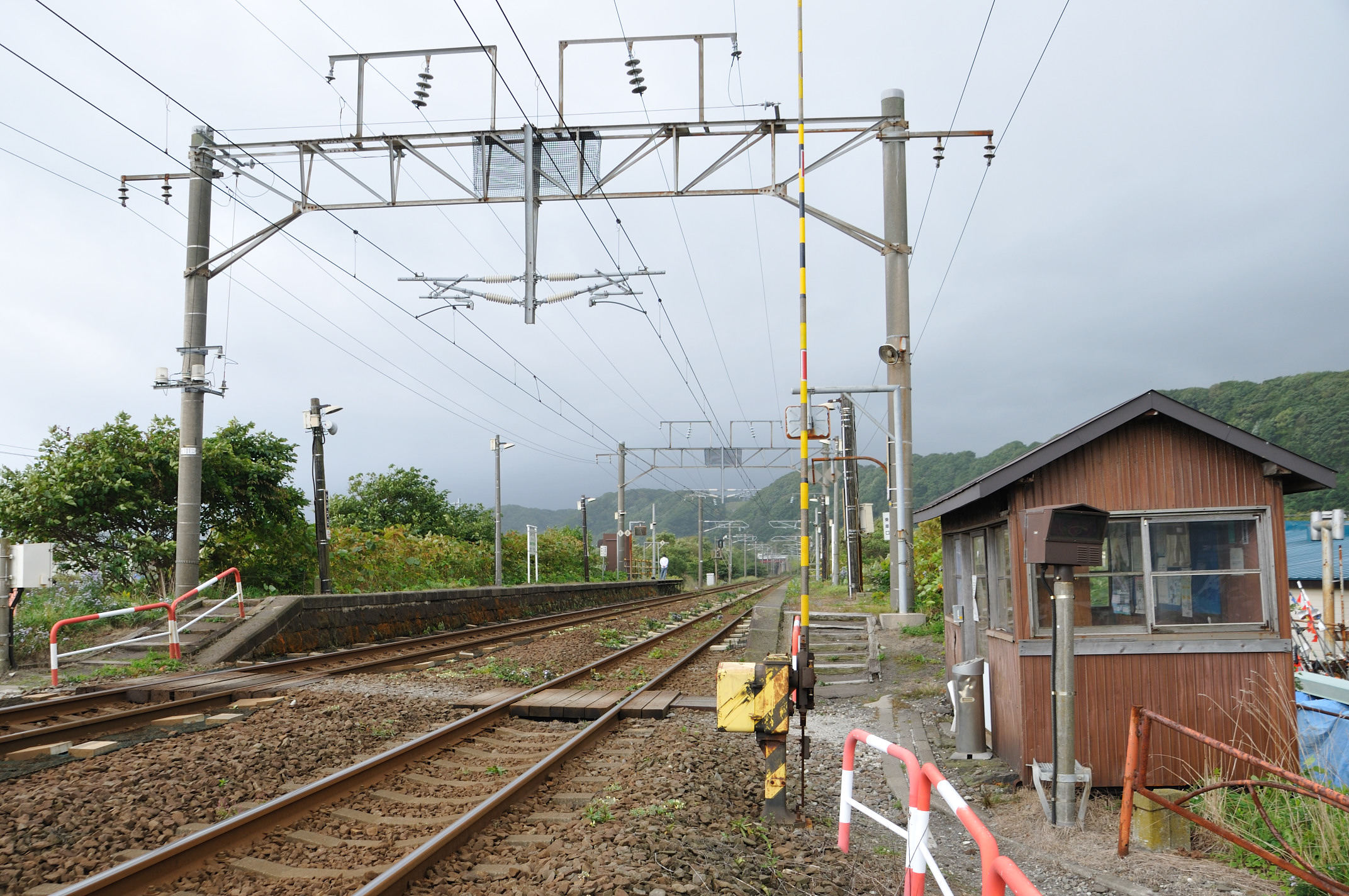
Tomiura Station

Tomiura Station (富浦駅, Tomiura-eki) is a railway station on the Muroran Main Line located in Noboribetsu, Hokkaidō, Japan operated by Hokkaido Railway Company (JR Hokkaido).

== Adjacent stations ==
«	Service	»
Muroran Main Line
Horobetsu	-	Noboribetsu
