= Misaki Station (Hokkaido) =

Railway station in Muroran, Hokkaido, Japan

Coordinates: 42°19′45″N 140°59′38″E

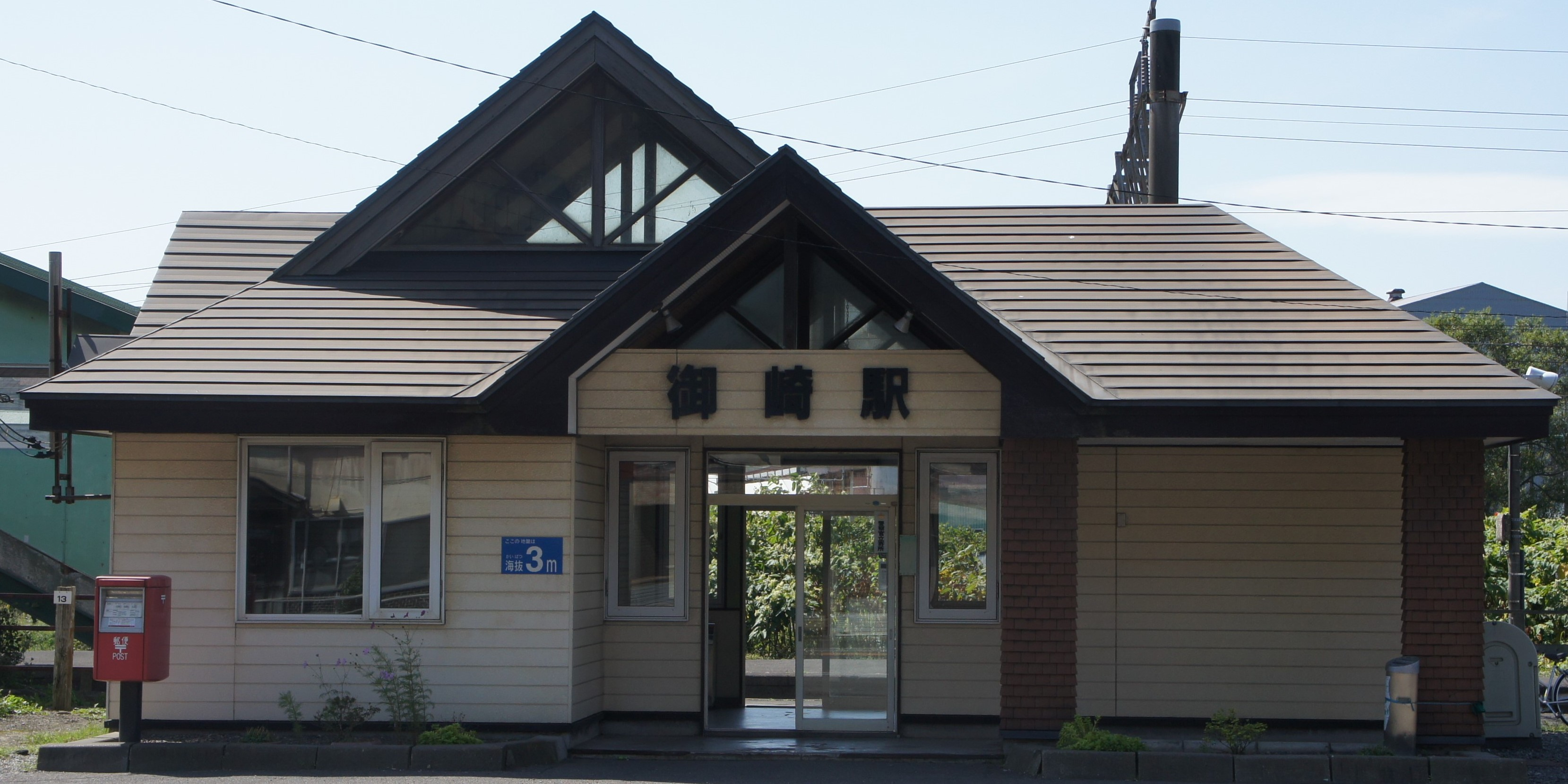
JR Muroran Main Line Misaki Station building

Misaki Station (御崎駅, Misaki-eki) is a train station in Muroran, Hokkaido, Japan.

== Lines ==
- Hokkaido Railway Company
  - Muroran Main Line Station M34

== Adjacent stations ==
«	Service	»
Muroran Main Line
Wanishi	-	Bokoi
