= Higashi-Muroran Station =

Railway station in Muroran, Hokkaido, Japan

H32 Higashi-Muroran Station 東室蘭駅
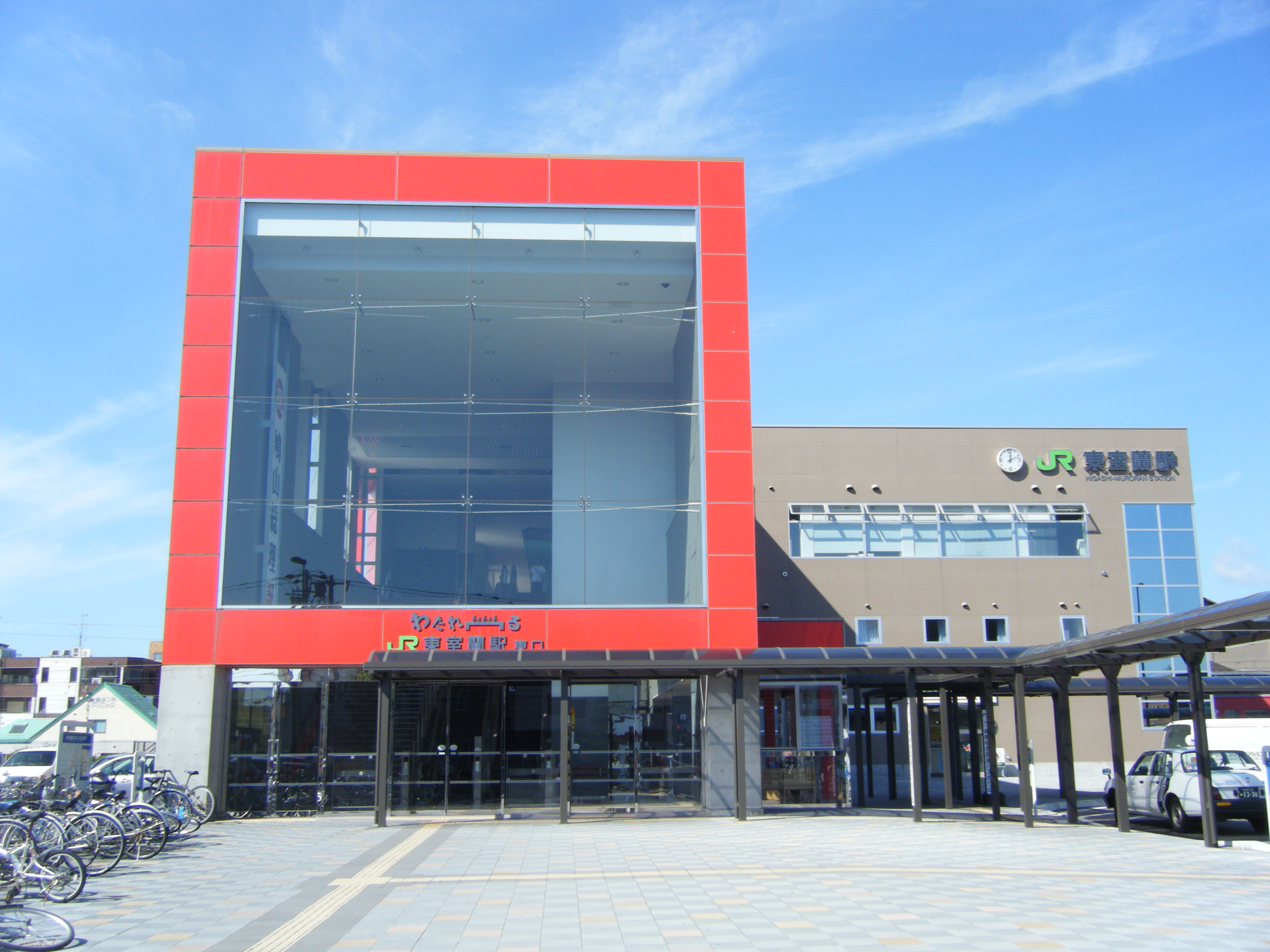
- The east entrance to the station in September 2009

General information
- Location: Muroran-shi, Hokkaido; Japan
- Coordinates: 42°20′55.77″N 141°1′31.56″E
- Operator: ■ JR Hokkaido
- Line: ■ Muroran Main Line
- Distance: 77.2 km from Oshamambe
- Platforms: 2 island platforms
- Tracks: 4

Construction
- Structure type: At-grade
- Accessible: Yes

Other information
- Status: Staffed
- Station code: H32
- Website: Official website

History
- Opened: 1 August 1892
- Rebuilt: 1 March 2008
Location

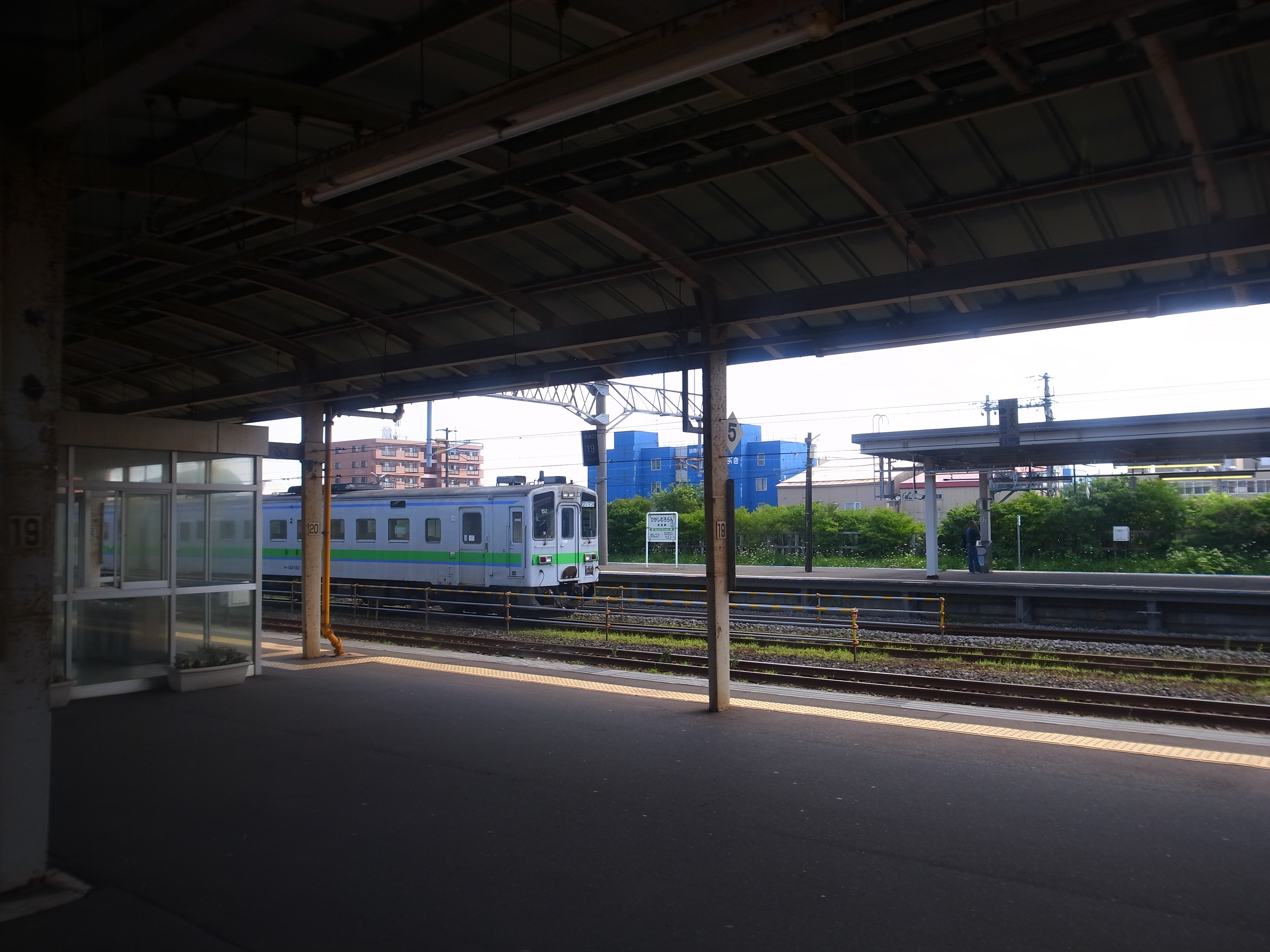
Station platforms, 2016

Higashi-Muroran Station (東室蘭駅, Higashi-Muroran-eki) is a railway station on the Muroran Main Line in Muroran, Hokkaido, Japan, operated by Hokkaido Railway Company (JR Hokkaido).

== Lines ==
Higashi-Muroran Station is served by the Muroran Main Line, and also forms the starting point of the Muroran Main Line Branch to Muroran.

== Station layout ==
The station has two island platforms serving four tracks.

=== Platforms ===
2/3	■ Muroran Main Line	for Noboribetsu and Tomakomai for Date-Monbetsu and Oshamanbe for Muroran
4	■ Muroran Main Line	for Hakodate (Limited express)
5	■ Muroran Main Line	for Sapporo (Limited express)

== Adjacent stations ==
«	Service	»
Muroran Main Line
Datemombetsu	Limited Express Hokuto	Noboribetsu
Direct to Branch Line for Muroran (Local)	Limited Express Suzuran	Washibetsu
Moto-Wanishi	Local	Washibetsu
Muroran Main Line Branch
Terminus	Local	Wanishi

== Limited express services ==
- Super Hokuto (Sapporo - Hakodate)
- Suzuran (Sapporo - Muroran)

== History ==
The station opened on 1 August 1892. With the privatization of Japanese National Railways (JNR) on 1 April 1987, the station came under the control of JR Hokkaido.

Higashi-Muroran Station became fully accessible on 1 March 2008 following a renovation of the station building.

== Surrounding area ==
- Muroran police station
- Higashi-Muroran Post office

== See also ==
- List of railway stations in Japan
