= Shiraoi District, Hokkaido =

District in Japan

Coordinates: 42°33′N 141°15′E

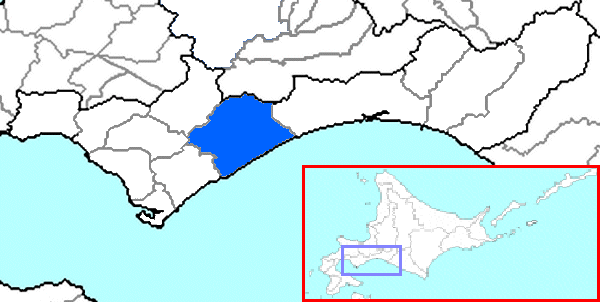
The area of Shiraoi District in Iburi Subprefecture.

Shiraoi (白老郡, Shiraoi-gun) is a district located in Iburi Subprefecture, Hokkaido, Japan.

As of 2004, the district has an estimated population of 20,866 and a density of 49.01 persons per km^{2}. The total area is 425.75 km^{2}.

== Towns and villages ==
- Shiraoi
