= Nicola Parente =

Italian-Brazilian wandering projectionist (1847–1911)

- Born: Nicola Maria Parente; 13 March 1847; Marsico Nuovo, Province of Basilicata, Kingdom of the Two Sicilies
- Died: 19 May 1911 (aged 64); Belém, Pará, Brazil
- Burial place: Santa Isabel Cemetery (Q104212769)
- Occupations: Dentist; Photographer; Projectionist
- Years active: c. 1875–c. 1899
- Known for: Introducing motion pictures to João Pessoa (PB), Natal (RN), Bragança Paulista (SP) and possibly Fortaleza (CE)

Nicola Maria Parente (13 March 1847 – 19 May 1911) was an Italian-Brazilian dentist, photographer and wandering projectionist. During his travels throughout Brazil in the late 19th century, Parente introduced motion pictures to several Brazilian capitals with the Lumière Cinématographe.

== Early life and family ==
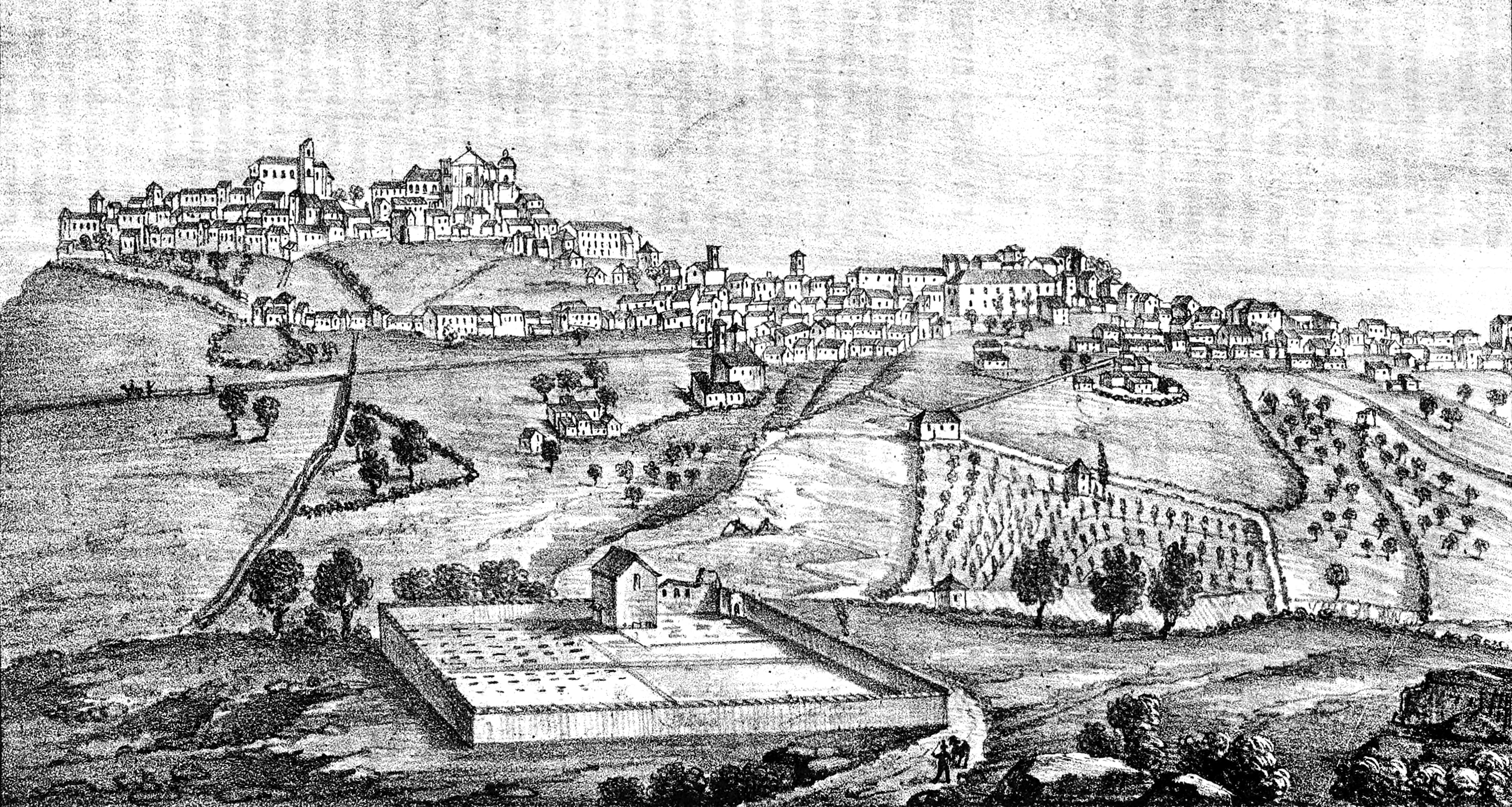
Illustration of the town of Marsico Nuovo in 1844

Nicola Parente was born on 13 March 1847 in Marsico Nuovo, in the Kingdom of the Two Sicilies, before the unification of Italy. His parents were Giovannantonio Parente, 33, landowner (Note: "possidente") and Maria Carmela Perci, 28.

There are conflicting accounts for Nicola Parente's first arrival to Brazil. Some sources claim 1865, migrating with his family from the Port of Genoa. Local newspapers place Parente arriving in Rio de Janeiro at least as early as 25 March 1871.

Parente purportedly arrived to Taquari in 1876, and a source claims that only then did family members migrate alongside him from Europe. In Taquari, he had at least four children with Maria Carolina Rotundo: Galileo, in 1877; Galvani, in 1878; and the twins Margarida and Timotheo, in 1880.

== Professional life ==
=== Early work ===
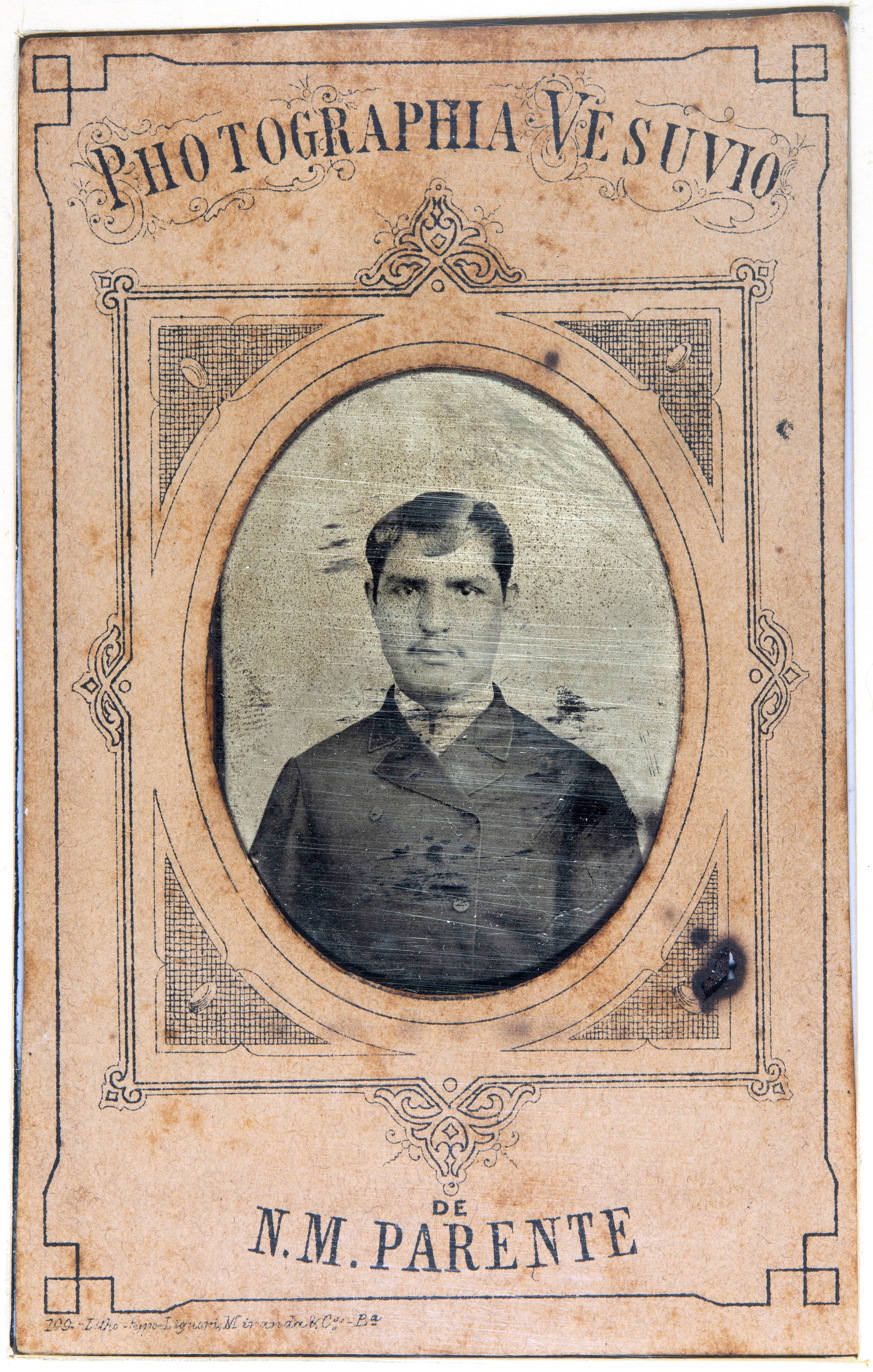
Photo taken at Parente's Photographia Vesuvio studio, likely in 1886

On 1 January 1881, Parente inaugurated a photographic studio, Photographia Italo-Brazileira (lit. 'Italian-Brazilian Photography'), in Florianópolis. Later that year, newspaper reports cite Parente as having taken portrait photographs during a previous visit 6 years earlier, in 1875. These photographs were described as being "as perfect as if they had been taken right now", and their quality was attributed to the pureness of the chemicals Parente used.

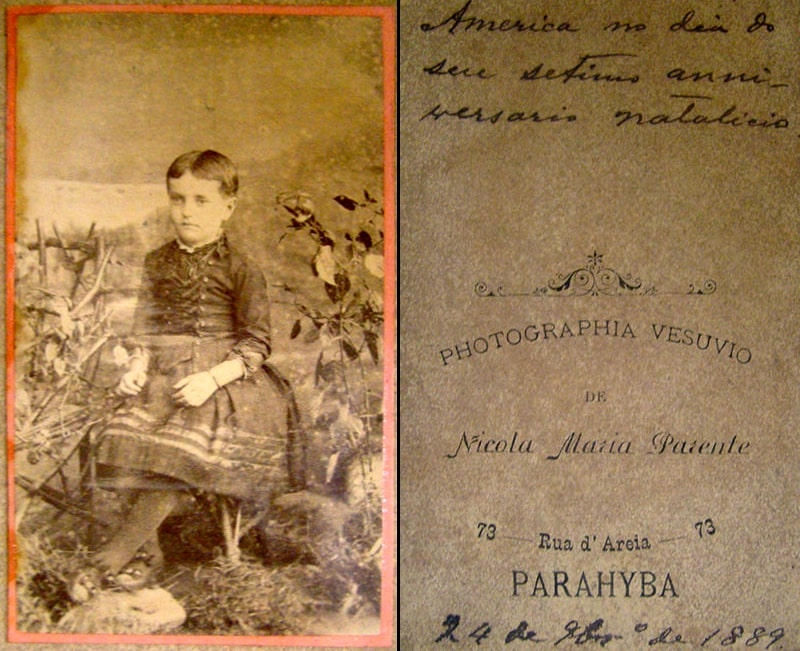
Photo taken at Photographia Vesuvio, in João Pessoa, on 24 November 1889. Caption reads: "America on the day of her seventh birthday"

From 1888 onwards, Parente worked in Goiana, Pedras de Fogo and João Pessoa as a dentist and photographer. In João Pessoa, Parente opened a studio called Photographia Vesuvio.

=== Wandering projectionist ===
In the mid-1890s, Parente travels to Europe and purchases the Lumière brothers' recently invented Cinématographe, a film projector, as well as some films shot by the Lumière. In 1897, Parente begins his wandering projections in Belém; on 28 July, Parente brings cinema to João Pessoa, the first time in the city's (and the state's) history. Among the films exhibited at that inaugural projection were the following:

- Le cortège (in 7 views: 490, 491, 492, 493, 494, 495, 496);
- Bains de Diane (277);
- Éléphants (44);
- Panorama du Grand Canal pris d'un bateau (295);
- Panorama de la place Saint-Marc pris d’un bateau (296);
- Cortège au mariage du prince de Naples (283, 284);
- Cavalcade (guerriers romains et abyssins) (24);
- Bataille de neige (101);
- Dragons traversant la Saône à la nage (186);
- Course en sacs (109);
- Partie de tric-trac (74).
Panorama du Grand Canal pris d’un bateau (1896)

Bataille de neige (1897)

Course en sacs (1896)

Partie de tric-trac (1896)

Parente holds his first film session in Fortaleza on 13 November 1897; it is unclear whether he or Dionísio Costa, another wandering projectionist who similarly brought a Lumière Cinématographe to the capital at that time, holds the title for the first cinematographic projection in the city. A few months later, on 16 April 1898, Parente introduces the movies to yet another city, Natal; he remains there until 8 May.

On 2 July 1898, Parente becomes the second person to ever project films in Salvador, losing only to Dionísio Costa, who had been there prior to going to Fortaleza. In Salvador, besides the moving pictures, Parente also presented "fixed views", which consisted of photographs of buildings, paintings, famous statues and people. Parente ends his Salvador run on 1 October, and then moves on to Bragança, being the first to project films there, starting on 6 November 1898. In 1899, Parente becomes the second person to bring cinema to Campinas. From 25 April 1899 to 5 May 1899, Parente presents seven films at São Paulo's Salão Progredior.

Afterwards, Parente returns to Belém and, on 10 December 1899, begins projecting in Manaus.

Parente's journey as a wandering projectionist ends in December 1899, after almost 3 years travelling the country. He would present films one last known time at Hotel América, again in Manaus, on 13 September 1900.

== Last years and death ==
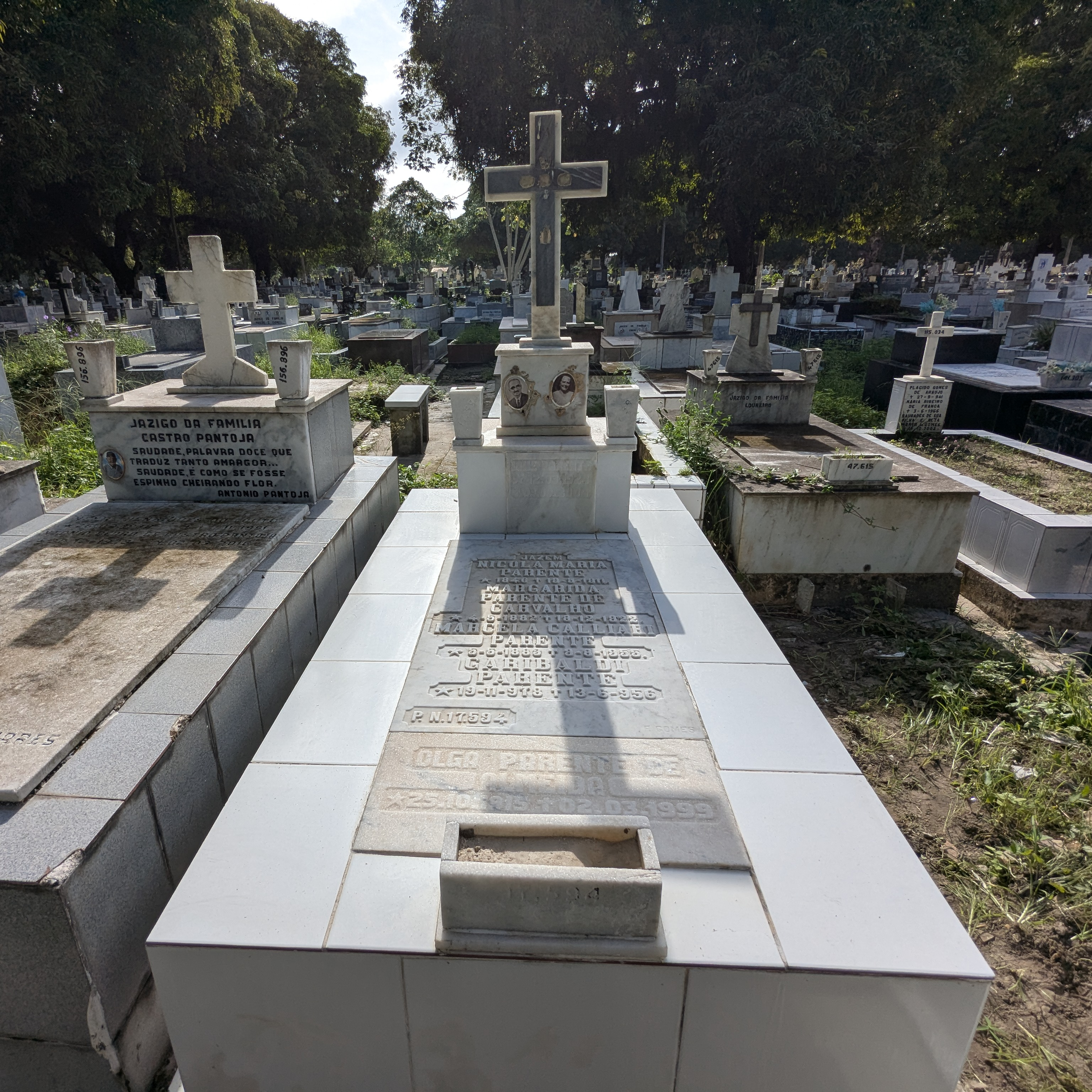
Parente's gravestone at Santa Isabel Cemetery, in Belém

After his wandering projectionist days, Nicola Parente moves to the small town of Abaeté in 1899, to manage a company with his son. While in Abaeté, Parente also resumes working with photography.

On 19 May 1911, Nicola Parente died of sepsis in a hospital in Belém, following an explosive accident while working with carbide.

=== Legacy ===
For his introduction of moving pictures to the state of Paraíba, Nicola Parente was chosen as patron for the #1 chair of the Academia Paraibana de Cinema (lit. 'Cinema Academy of Paraíba'), founded in 2008.
