= Kogane Station =

Kogane Station (黄金駅) is the name of two train stations in Japan:

- Kogane Station (Aichi)
- Kogane Station (Hokkaido)
