= Yukigassen =

Snowball fighting-competition from Japan

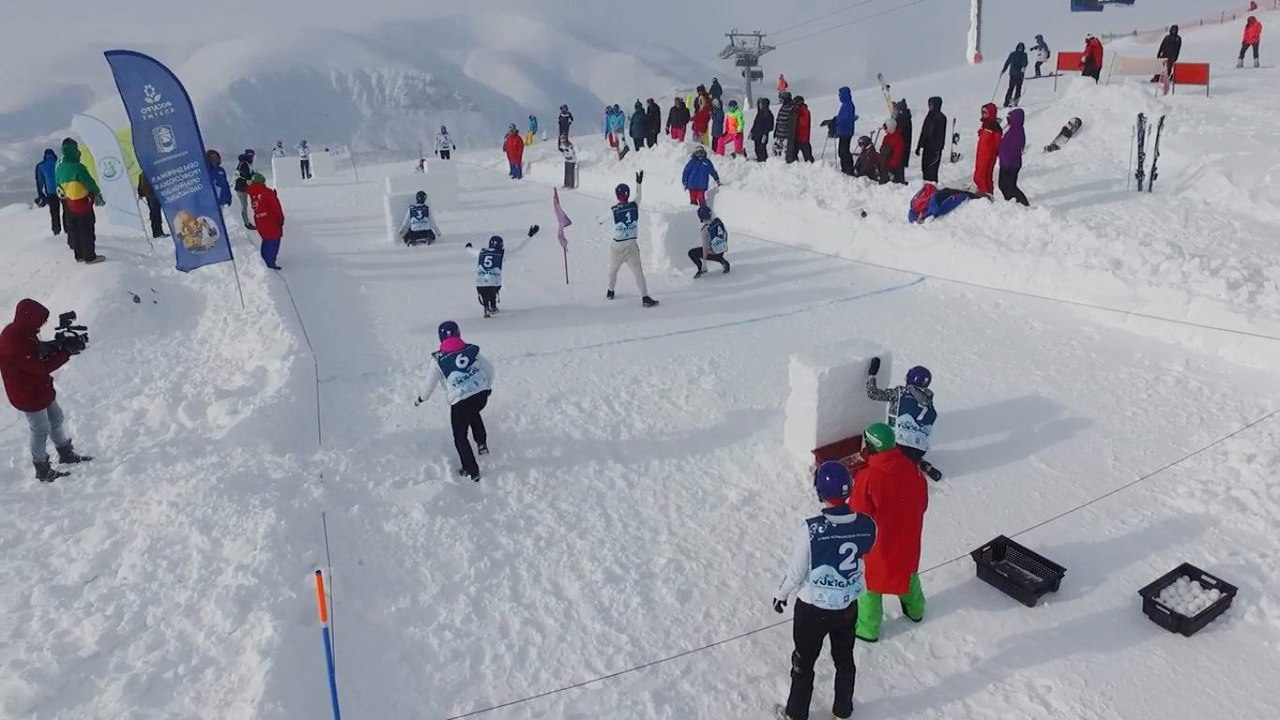
- A yukigassen tournament final in 2018
- Highest governing body: International Alliance Yukigassen
- First played: 1989, Sōbetsu, Hokkaido, Japan

Characteristics
- Team members: 7 players per side
- Type: Team sport, Snowball fight
- Equipment: Snowball
- Venue: snow pitch

Presence
- Country or region: Worldwide (most popular in Japan and Finland)

Kemijärvi Yukigassen 2011 Final

Yukigassen (雪合戦; IPA: [jɯkiɡaꜜsseɴ]) is a snowball fighting-competition played between two teams of seven players each on a pitch of snow 10 meters wide and 36 meters long. The pitch is divided into halves, and each half has three defensive "shelters" and the team flag. The goal of the game is to either capture the other team's flags or to eliminate all of the other team's players by hitting them with snowballs, 90 of which are made prior to the start of gameplay. The game has been compared to capture the flag, dodgeball, and paintball.

Court for the Japanese snow game Yukigassen

== Etymology ==
In Japanese, yukigassen is a compound of the words yuki (雪; 'snow') and kassen (合戦; 'battle', with rendaku to gassen). It is a common term for 'snowball fight' in Japanese.

== History ==
The sport was founded in 1989 in the town of Sōbetsu on the island of Hokkaido, after local officials sought a way to boost falling tourism in wintertime. The first tournament was held that year at the base of the Shōwa-shinzan volcano, featuring 70 teams. In 1991, the first women's yukigassen tournament was held. The Japanese Yukigassen Federation was formed in 1993. An international association was formed in 2013.

The sport rapidly spread to other countries, and was first played in the United States in 2001. The first tournament outside of Japan was held in Australia in 1992, and games were held in Finland that same year. In 1996, the first annual yukigassen event was held in Norway, and competitions were held in Sweden in 2009. In 2024, the first national yukigassen championship was held in Austria. By 2025, ten countries had joined Yukigassen International. The game remains the most popular in Japan, where there were 2000 teams by 2011.

The Japanese Yukigassen Federation has been lobbying to include yukigassen as a sport in the Winter Olympics. Today there are annual tournaments in Sōbetsu in Japan, Kemijärvi in Finland, Vardø in Norway, Murmansk in Russia, Mount Buller in Australia, Luleå in Sweden, Anchorage in Alaska, Aparan in Armenia, Jasper and Saskatoon in Canada.

== Tournaments ==
Yukigassen tournaments are held in countries across Europe, Asia, and North America. The world championship is held annually in Sōbetsu, Hokkaidō, Japan.

Tournament	Host city	Last Held	Current Winner
World Championship	(Japan) Sōbetsu, Hokkaidō	2025	
European Championship	Kemijärvi, Finland	2025	
Swedish Championship	Luleå, Sweden	2026	EK6
Nordic Championship	Vardø, Norway	2026	Yeti
Australian Championship	(Australia) Mount Baw Baw	2025	
Russian Championship	Murmansk, Russia		
Canadian Championship	Jasper, Canada	2013	
Armenian Championship	Aparan, Armenia	2025	Team Tehran
Austrian Yukigassen Championship	Filzmoos, Austria	2025	BORG Radstadt

== See also ==
- Snowball fight
