= Ōtaki, Hokkaido =

Dissolved municipality in Usu district, Hokkaido, Japan

Ōtaki 大滝村 いくたはらちょう
- Town
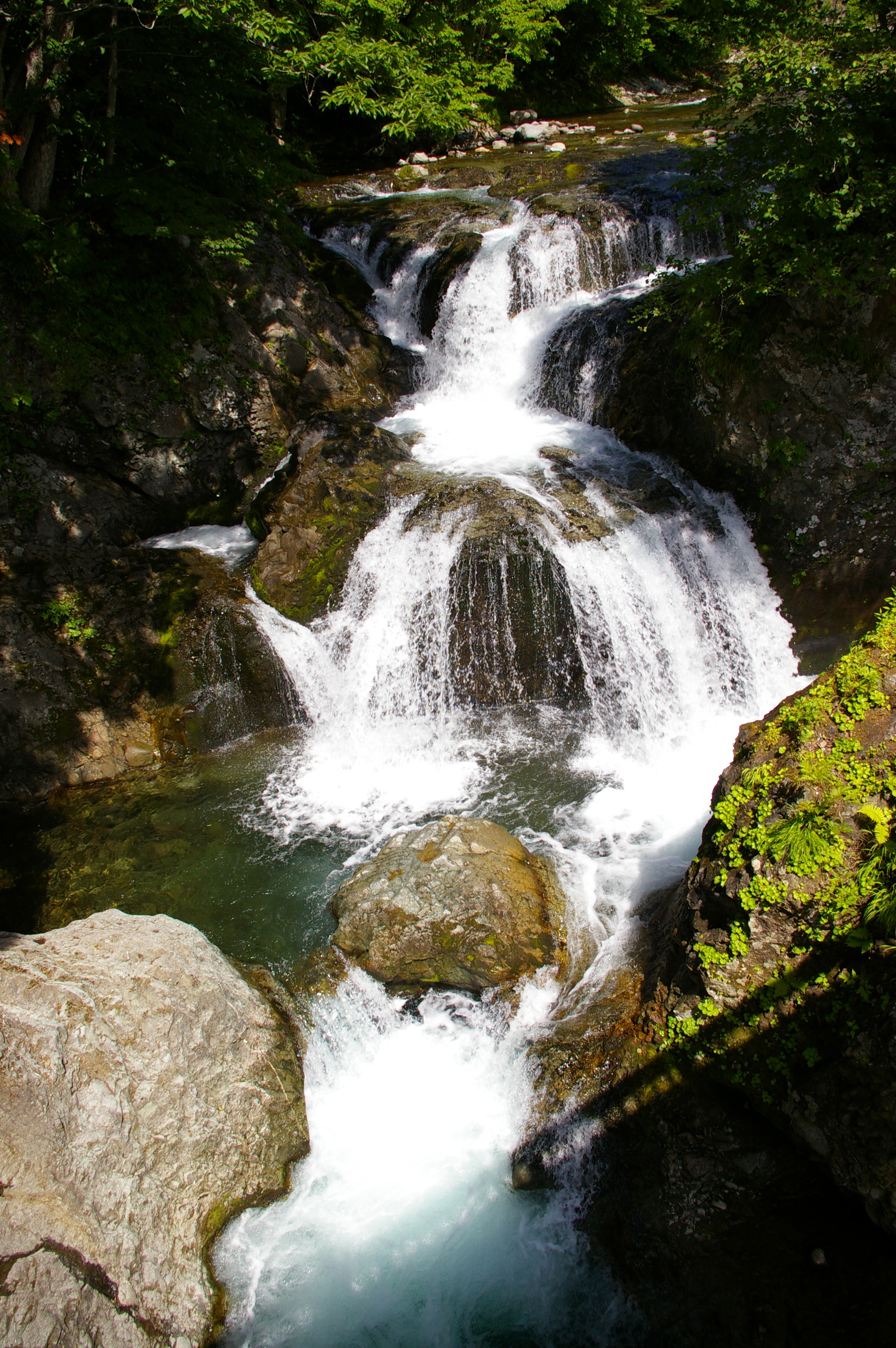
- Sankai-Taki Falls

- Flag Seal
- Interactive map of Ōtaki
- Country: Japan
- Region: Hokkaido
- Prefecture: Hokkaido
- Subprefecture: Iburi
- District: Usu

Area
  - Total: 274.03 km^{2} (105.80 sq mi)

Population (2004)
  - Total: 2,054
  - Density: 7.496/km^{2} (19.41/sq mi)

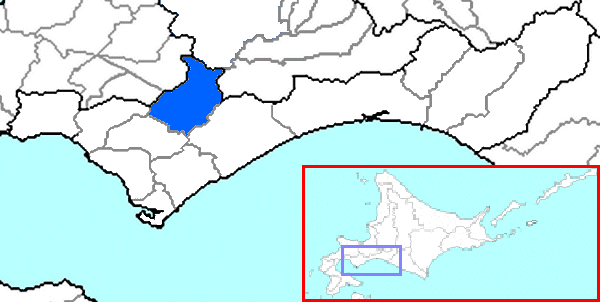
Otaki in Iburi Subprefecture

Ōtaki (大滝村, Ōtaki-mura) was a village located in Usu District, Iburi Subprefecture, Hokkaido, Japan.

As of 2004, the village had an estimated population of 2,054 and a density of 7.50 persons per km^{2}. The total area was 274.03 km^{2}.

On 1 March 2006, Ōtaki was merged into the city of Date.

== Climate ==
Climate data for Ōtaki (1991−2020 normals, extremes 1977−present)
Month	Jan	Feb	Mar	Apr	May	Jun	Jul	Aug	Sep	Oct	Nov	Dec	Year
Record high °C (°F)	5.7 (42.3)	10.9 (51.6)	14.3 (57.7)	23.0 (73.4)	29.9 (85.8)	32.5 (90.5)	32.4 (90.3)	33.0 (91.4)	30.3 (86.5)	26.1 (79.0)	18.1 (64.6)	10.9 (51.6)	33.0 (91.4)
Mean daily maximum °C (°F)	−3.1 (26.4)	−2.1 (28.2)	2.0 (35.6)	8.8 (47.8)	16.1 (61.0)	20.2 (68.4)	23.4 (74.1)	24.2 (75.6)	20.4 (68.7)	13.7 (56.7)	5.8 (42.4)	−1.1 (30.0)	10.7 (51.2)
Daily mean °C (°F)	−7.2 (19.0)	−6.6 (20.1)	−2.7 (27.1)	3.3 (37.9)	9.6 (49.3)	14.3 (57.7)	18.2 (64.8)	19.1 (66.4)	14.6 (58.3)	7.8 (46.0)	1.3 (34.3)	−4.8 (23.4)	5.6 (42.0)
Mean daily minimum °C (°F)	−12.2 (10.0)	−12.3 (9.9)	−8.1 (17.4)	−1.9 (28.6)	3.5 (38.3)	9.0 (48.2)	14.0 (57.2)	14.7 (58.5)	9.3 (48.7)	2.3 (36.1)	−3.1 (26.4)	−9.2 (15.4)	0.5 (32.9)
Record low °C (°F)	−24.9 (−12.8)	−24.7 (−12.5)	−21.4 (−6.5)	−16.3 (2.7)	−4.0 (24.8)	−1.4 (29.5)	2.4 (36.3)	4.8 (40.6)	−0.6 (30.9)	−5.9 (21.4)	−15.7 (3.7)	−22.0 (−7.6)	−24.9 (−12.8)
Average precipitation mm (inches)	100.6 (3.96)	84.9 (3.34)	96.1 (3.78)	100.7 (3.96)	123.9 (4.88)	81.3 (3.20)	137.4 (5.41)	187.0 (7.36)	178.6 (7.03)	152.8 (6.02)	147.0 (5.79)	122.0 (4.80)	1,513.7 (59.59)
Average snowfall cm (inches)	188 (74)	160 (63)	147 (58)	56 (22)	1 (0.4)	0 (0)	0 (0)	0 (0)	0 (0)	4 (1.6)	70 (28)	188 (74)	813 (320)
Average precipitation days (≥ 1.0 mm)	19.6	17.7	17.3	13.3	12.4	10.6	11.4	11.9	12.8	14.9	17.5	20.8	180.2
Average snowy days	20.3	17.9	17.4	8.8	0.1	0	0	0	0	0.5	7.8	20.2	93
Mean monthly sunshine hours	44.1	59.4	100.6	160.2	190.7	168.0	137.1	139.6	142.4	126.1	72.3	39.8	1,378.2
Source: JMA
