= Snowball fight =

Game in which participants throw snow at each other

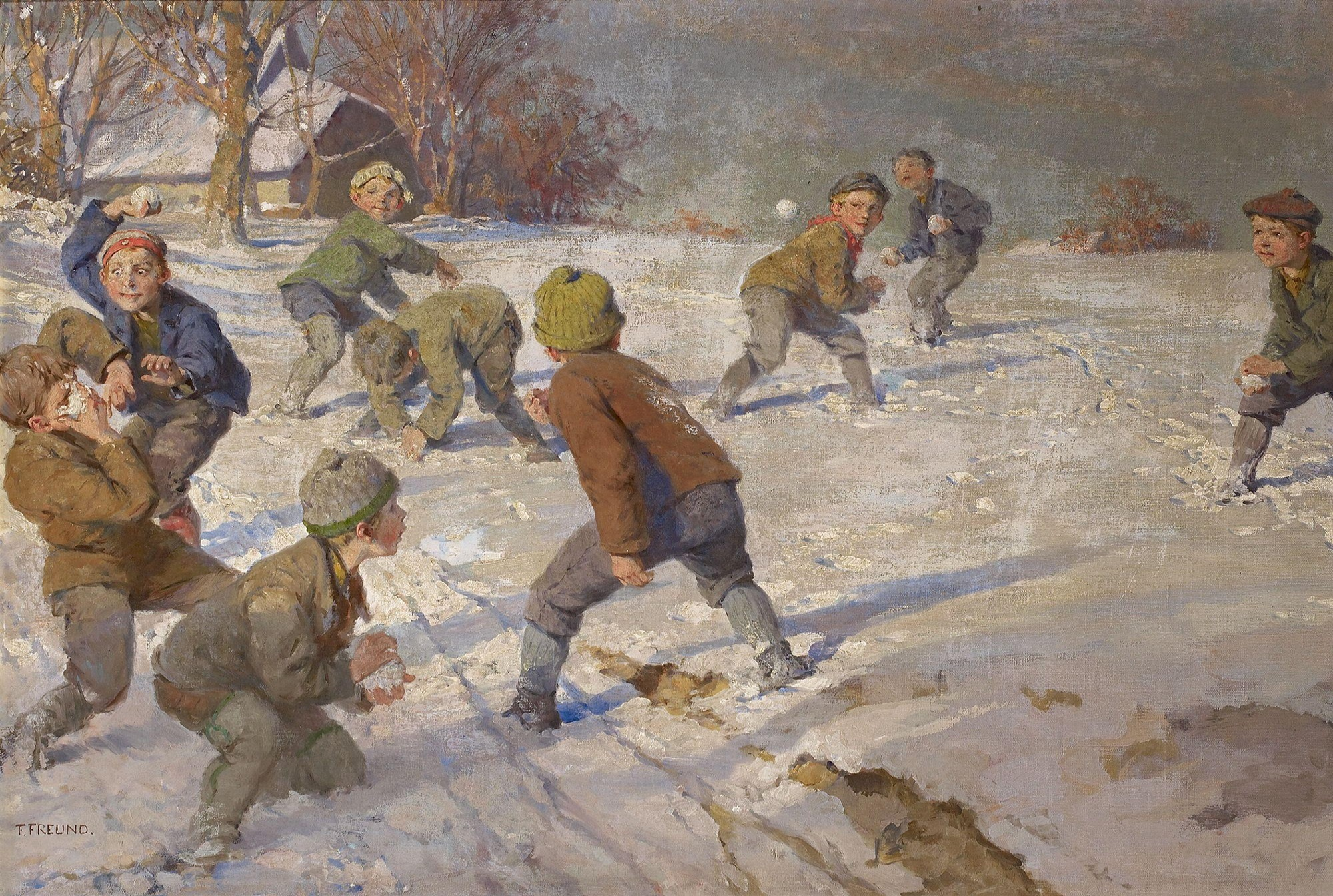
Schneeballschlacht, Fritz Freund, c. 1890

A snowball fight is a physical game in which balls of snow are thrown with the intention of hitting somebody else. The game is similar to dodgeball in its major factors, though typically less organized. This activity is primarily played during winter when there is sufficient snowfall.

== History ==
Snowball fights are depicted in European medieval manuscripts. They were also depicted in artwork throughout Renaissance Europe and appear in Japanese artwork as early as the 11th century.

=== Legal prohibition ===
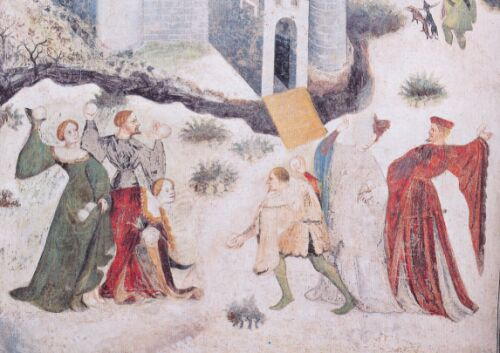
Detail of a snowball fight in a medieval fresco (c. 1400) of "January," from a series of frescos depicting the Cycle of the Months in the Torre dell'Aquila (Eagle Tower) in Buonconsiglio Castle, Trento, Italy.

In 1472, the city council of Amsterdam allegedly prohibited snowball fights for reasons of public safety, a prohibition which occasionally finds its way into lists of strange laws. The law, if it ever existed, is not presently enforced.

Several localities have passed ordinances prohibiting snowball fights, typically as part of a larger prohibition on thrown missiles. In 2018, the town council of Severance, Colorado unanimously overturned one such ban after hearing from a local youth. Similarly, after its "snowball ordinance" became the subject of national news coverage, the city of Wausau, Wisconsin chose to remove the word "snowball" from a list of dangerous objects specifically prohibited from being thrown on public property.

Many elementary schools prohibit snowball fights because children will often inadvertently fashion snowballs with snow that contains small rocks, ice, or other debris, potentially causing serious injury when thrown.

=== Large snowball fights ===
In 1838, a snowball fight between students at the University of Edinburgh and local tradesmen turned violent and led to suppression by armed police and the Scottish army.

During the American Civil War, on January 29, 1863, the largest military snow exchange occurred in the Rappahannock Valley in Northern Virginia. What began as a few hundred men from Texas plotting a friendly fight against their Arkansas camp mates soon escalated into a brawl that involved 9,000 soldiers of the Army of Northern Virginia.

In his memoir of the American Civil War, Samuel H. Sprott describes a snowball battle that occurred early in 1864 involving the Army of Tennessee. Sprott states that the fight started when Strahl’s Brigade was attacked by a brigade of Breckenridge’s Division, but soon other brigades became involved, and ultimately five or six thousand men were engaged.

On January 29, 2005, a crowd of 3,027 people gathered in the town of Wauconda, Illinois, for a snowball fight organized by Bill Lutz, a Lions Club member and risk assessment manager for the Wauconda Park District. The town receivied a mention in the 2006 Guinness Book of World Records.

On October 14, 2009, 5,768 people in Leuven, Belgium, took part in a University of Pennsylvania–funded snowball fight and broke the world record for the largest snowball fight.

Bataille de neige, an 1897 French silent film depicting a snowball fight

On December 9, 2009, an estimated crowd of over 4,000 students at the University of Wisconsin–Madison participated in a snowball fight on Bascom Hill. There were reports of several injuries, mainly broken noses, and some vandalism, mainly stolen lunch trays from Memorial Union. The snowball fight was scheduled weeks in advance, and was helped by the fact that the University canceled all classes due to 12–16 inches of snow that fell the night before. However, this snowball fight failed to break the record set in October of the same year in Leuven.

On January 22, 2010, 5,387 people in Taebaek, South Korea, set the world record for most people engaged in a snowball fight.

On February 6, 2010, some 2,000 people met at Dupont Circle in Washington, D.C., for a snowball fight organized over the internet after over two feet of snow fell in the region during the North American blizzards of 2010. The event was promoted via Facebook and Twitter. At least a half-dozen D.C. and U.S. Park police cars were positioned around Dupont Circle throughout the snowball fight. Minor injuries were reported. The snowball fight has been repeated after other major snowstorms.

On January 12, 2013, 5,834 people in Seattle, Washington, set the Guinness World Records record for the world's largest snowball fight during Seattle's Snow Day.

On February 8, 2013, nearly 2,500 students of the Boston University participated in a snowball fight on Boston's Charles River Esplanade facilitated by historic winter storm "Nemo".

Yukigassen (雪合戦) is a snowball fighting-competition originating in Japan. There are annual Yukigassen tournaments in Japan, Finland, Norway, Russia, Sweden, the United States and Canada.

Seattle's world record was broken on January 31, 2016, in Saskatoon, Saskatchewan, Canada, where more than 20,000 participants came to Victoria park to attempt to break the Guinness World Record. Rick Mercer was one of the participants who came to shoot an episode about Team Canada's Yukigassen team and compete in the world record. Underestimating the number of participants the event ran out of their 8200 wristbands hours before the competition took place. In total 7,681 participants was the official Guinness record and was achieved by the City of Saskatoon thanks to Yukigassen Team Canada.

The event was organized to send off Team Canada for the Showa Shinzan International Yukigassen World Championships, an annual professional snowball fighting competition.

== Gallery ==
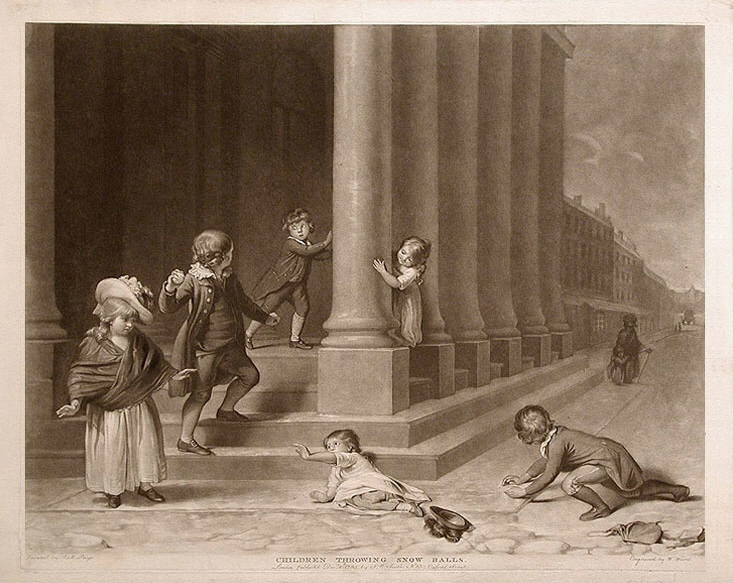
Children in Europe throwing snowballs, 1785

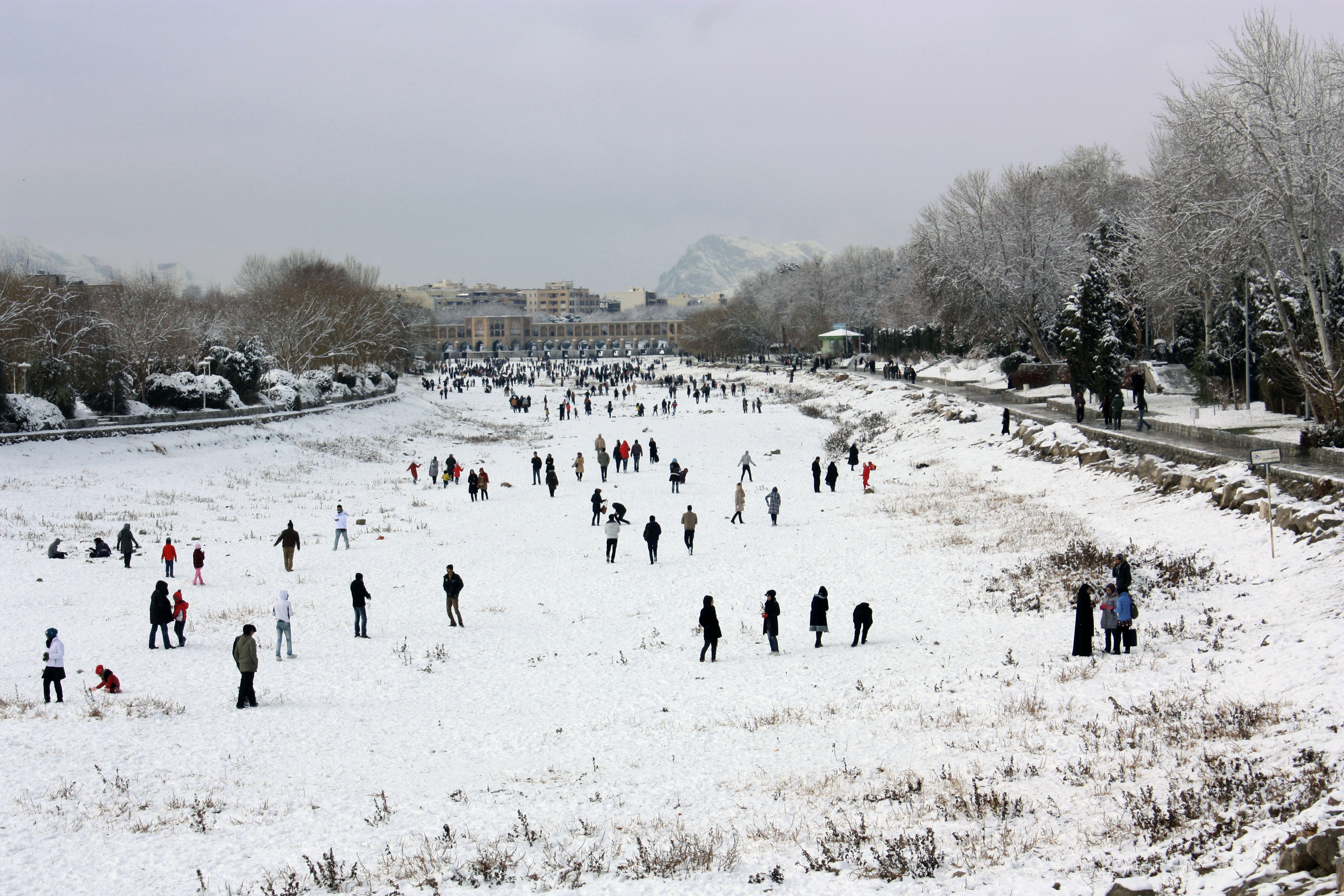
Large snowball fight in dry riverbed of Zayanderud, Iran, in 2014

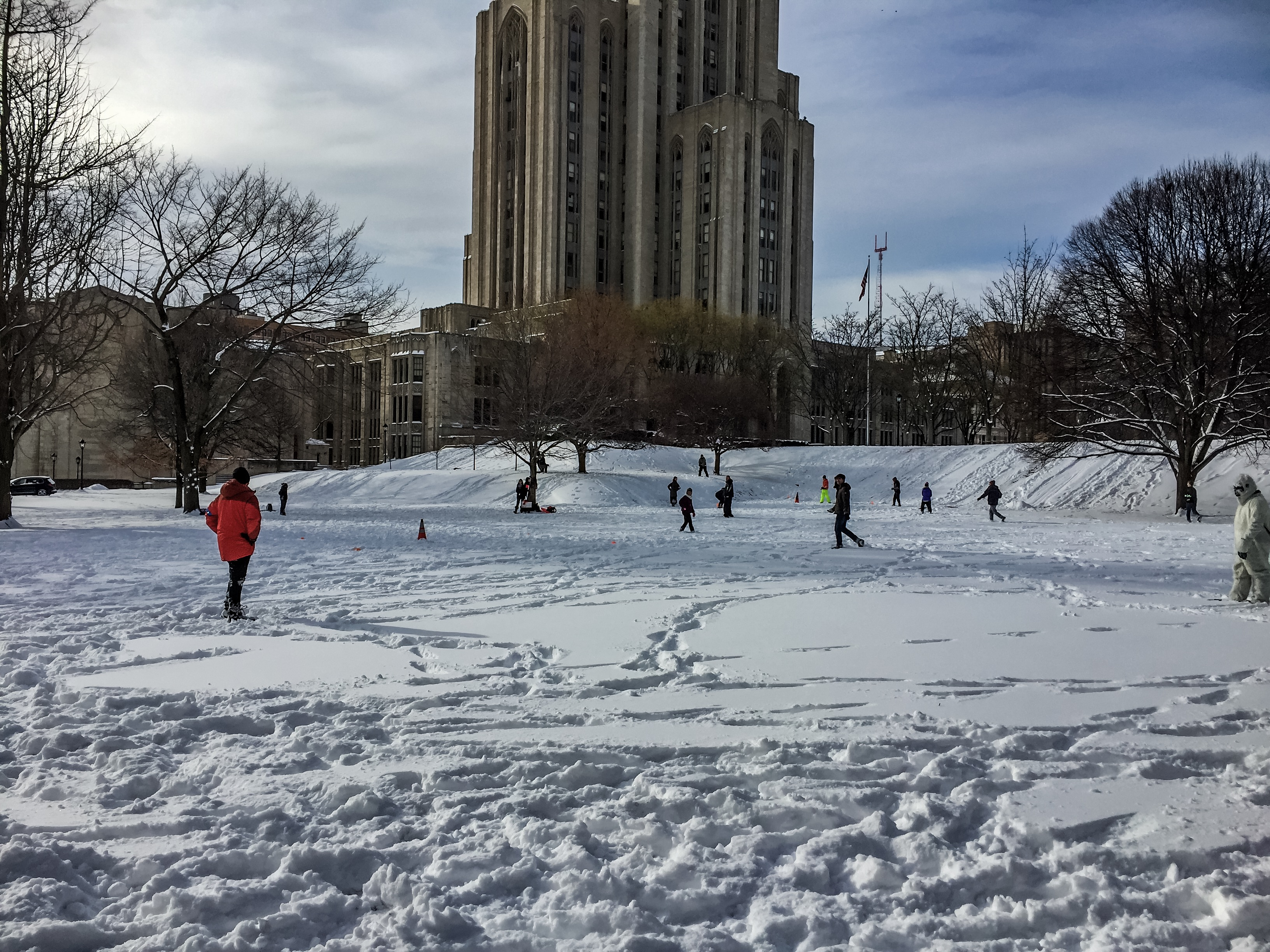
Organized snowball fight on the lawn of the Cathedral of Learning at the University of Pittsburgh, 2016

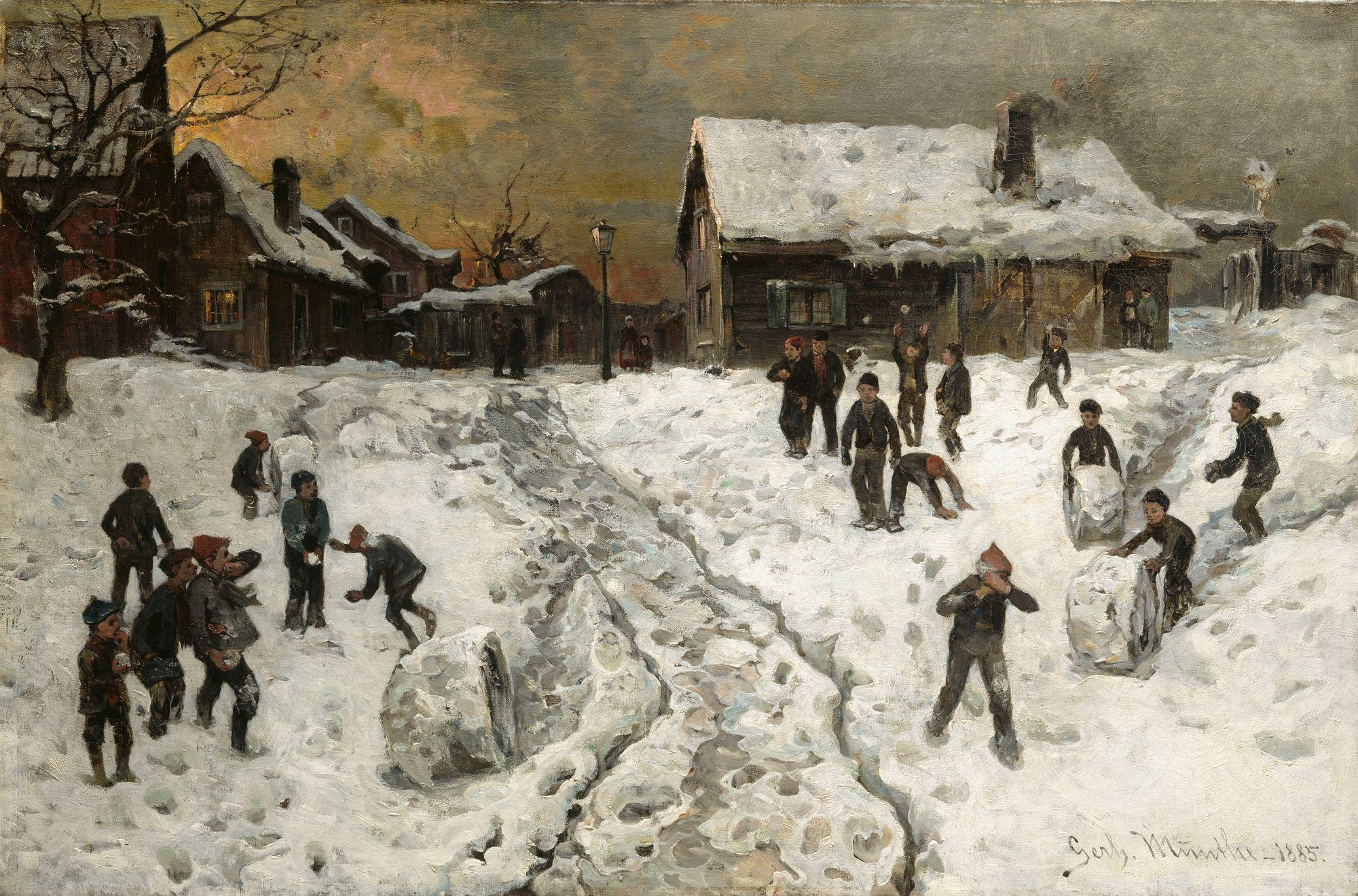
Sneballkasting, Gerhard Munthe, 1885

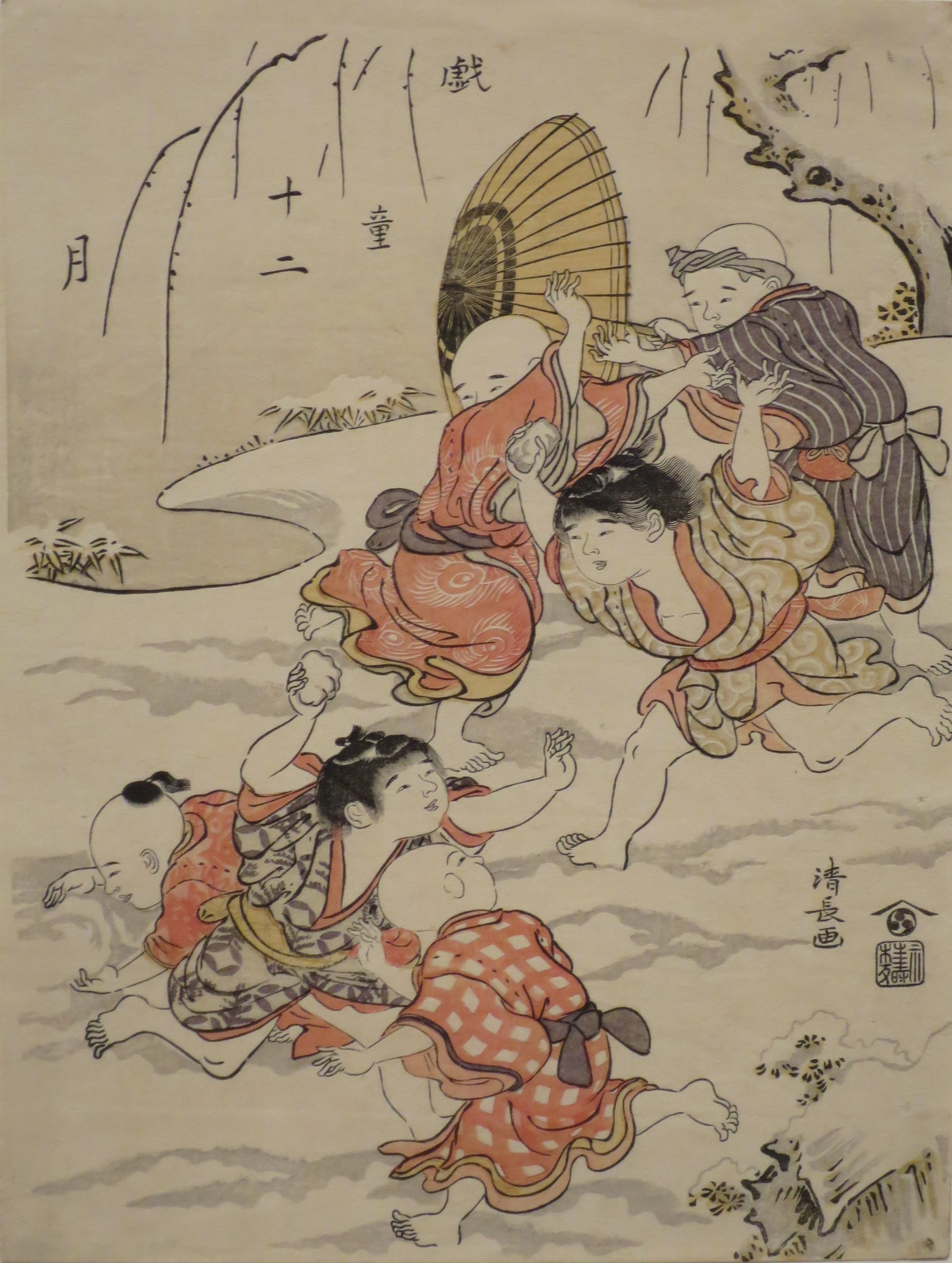
Snowball Fight, Torii Kiyonaga, 1787

== See also ==
- Bataille de neige (Short film, 1897)
- Water fight
- Winter holiday season
