= Usu District, Hokkaido =

District in Hokkaido, Japan

Coordinates: 42.573°N 140.946°E

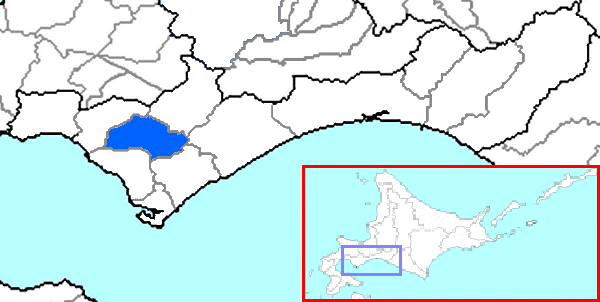
The area of Usu District in Iburi Subprefecture

Usu (有珠郡, Usu-gun) is a district located in Iburi Subprefecture, Hokkaido, Japan. As of March 2008, the district has an estimated population of 3,009 and a density of 14.7 persons/km^{2}. The total area is 205.04 km^{2}.

The district has only one town, Sōbetsu.

== Timeline ==
- July 1, 1900 - Due to the Hokkaido 1st class municipal status enforcement, the village of Date was formed within Usu District. (1 village)
- April 1, 1915 - Due to the Hokkaido 2nd class municipal status enforcement, the village of Sōbetsu was formed within Usu District. (2 villages)
- 1916 - Population: 21,011. Malaria Patients: 20.
- April 1, 1919 - Due to the Sōbetsu, Hokkaido 2nd class municipal status enforcement, the village of Tokushunbetsu was formed within Usu District. (3 villages)
- June 1920 - Parts of the village of Tokushunbetsu merged into the village of Kimobetsu, Abuta District (now the town of Kimobetsu).
- August 1, 1925 - The village of Date became the 1st class town of Date. (1 town, 2 villages)
- April 1, 1939 - The village of Sōbetsu became the 1st class village.
- June 1, 1943 - 1st and 2nd class municipal status abolished. The village of Tokushunbetu became an officially designated village, according to the Ministry of Interior.
- October 5, 1946 - Designated municipal status enforcement abolished.
- September 1, 1950 - The village of Tokushunbetsu was renamed Ōtaki.
- January 1, 1962 - The village of Sōbetsu gained town status to become the town of Sōbetsu. (2 towns, 1 village)
- April 1, 1972 - The town of Date gained city status to become the city of Date. (1 town, 1 village)
- March 1, 2006 - The village of Ōtaki merged into the city of Date. (1 town)
