= Mareppu Station =

Railway station in Date, Hokkaido, Japan

Coordinates: 42.4257°N 140.8995°E

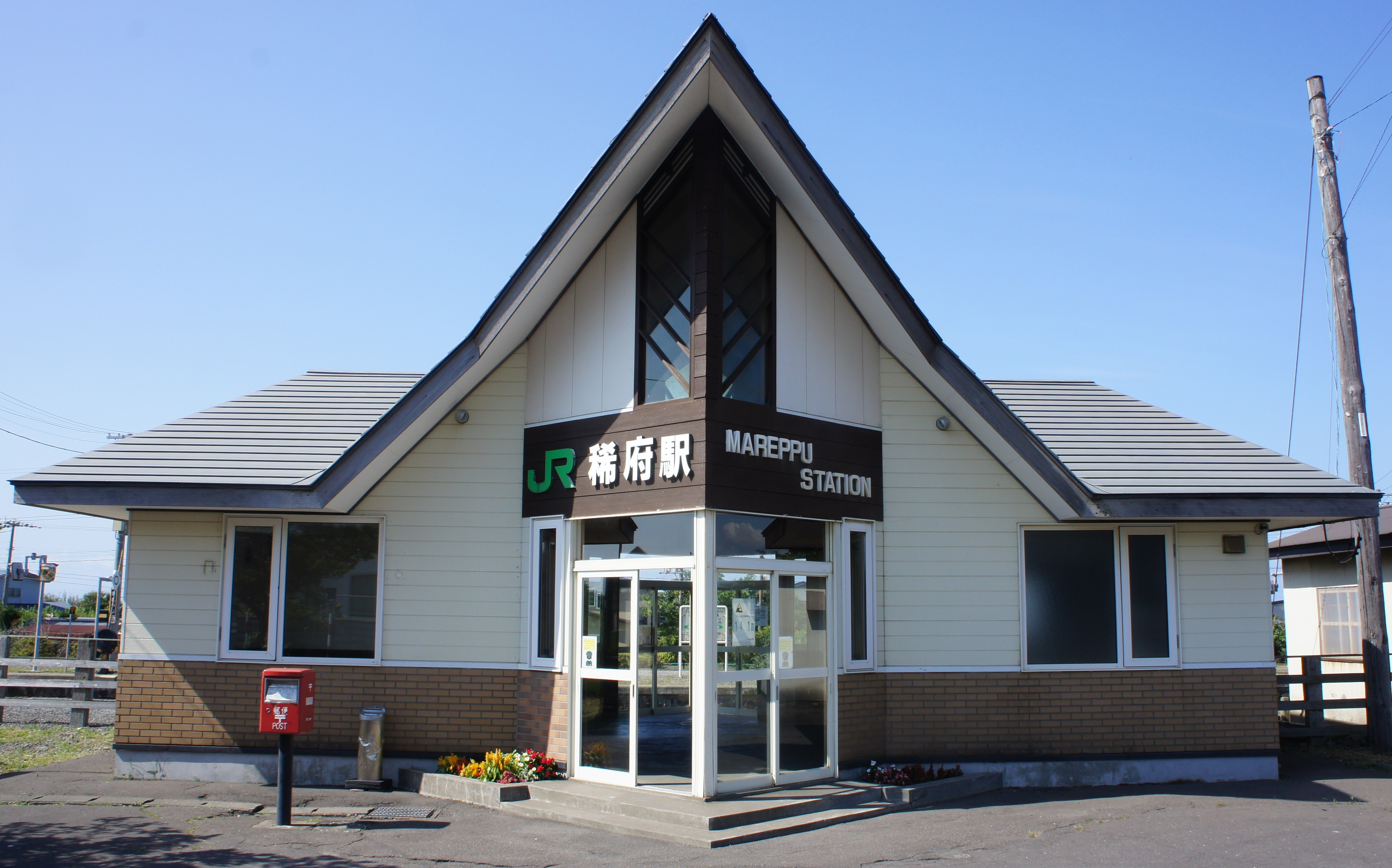
JR Muroran-Main-Line Mareppu Station building

Mareppu Station (稀府駅, Mareppu-eki) is a train station in Date, Hokkaidō, Japan. The station celebrated its centennial in 2025. It serves the JR Muroran Main Line.

== Lines ==
- Hokkaido Railway Company
  - Muroran Main Line Station H36

== Adjacent stations ==
«	Service	»
Muroran Main Line
Kita-Funaoka	-	Kogane
