= Date, Hokkaido =

Date 伊達市
- City
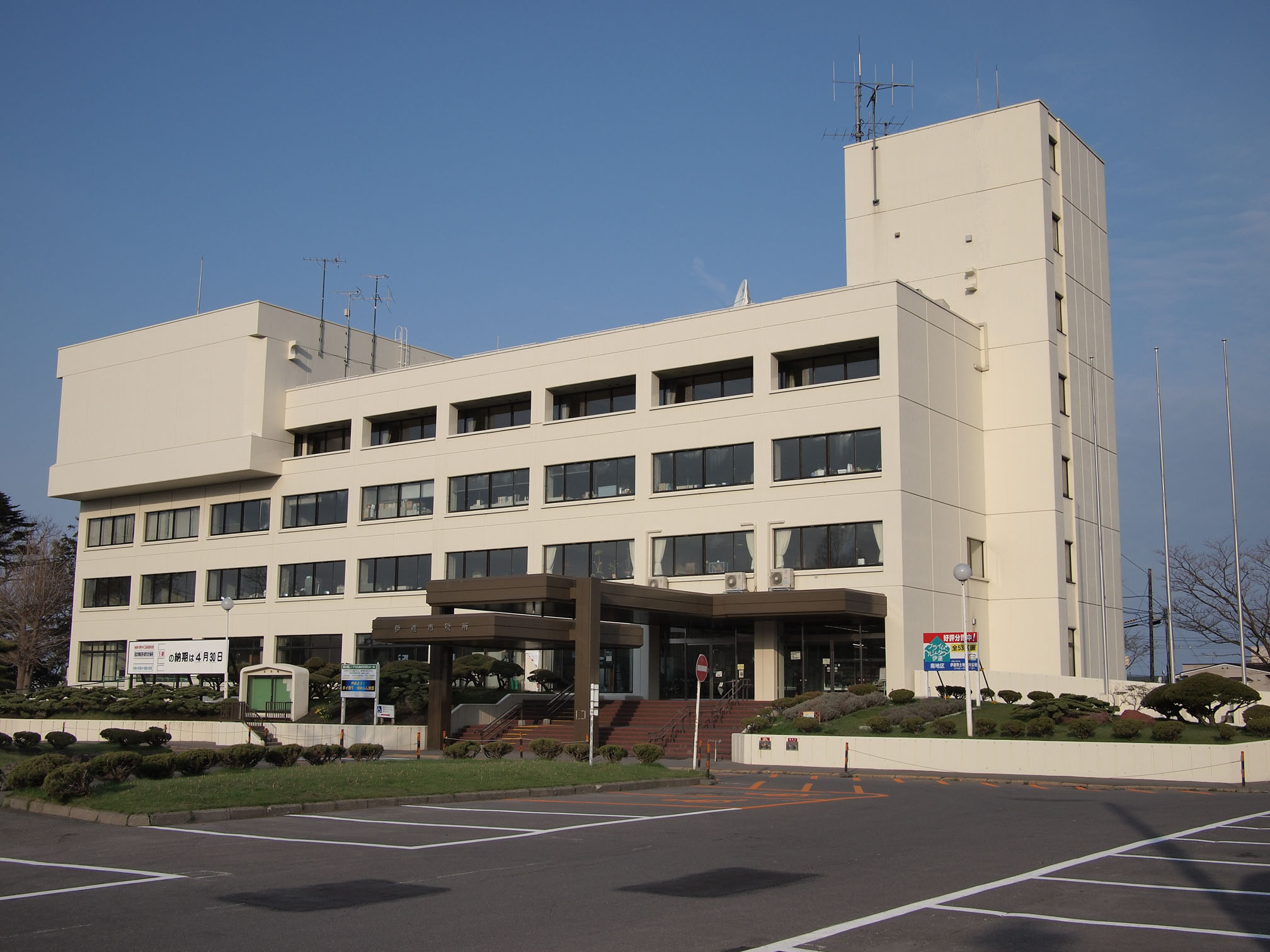
- Date City Hall

- Flag Emblem

- Location of Date in Hokkaido (Iburi Subprefecture)

- Location in Japan
- Coordinates: 42°28′N 140°52′E
- Country: Japan
- Region: Hokkaido
- Prefecture: Hokkaido (Iburi Subprefecture)

Government
  - Mayor: Keita Horii (since May 2023)

Area
  - Total: 444.28 km^{2} (171.54 sq mi)

Population (October 1, 2020)
  - Total: 32,826
  - Density: 73.886/km^{2} (191.36/sq mi)
- Time zone: UTC+09:00 (JST)
- City hall address: 20-1 Kashimachō, Date-shi, Hokkaidō; 052-0024
- Climate: Dfa/Dfb
- Website: www.city.date.hokkaido.jp
- Symbols
- Flower: Azalea
- Tree: Sargent's cherry

Date (伊達市, Date-shi; [date], DAH-tay) is a city in Iburi Subprefecture, Hokkaido, Japan. Date was established around 1869, and became a city on April 1, 1972.

== History ==
Remains of settlements from the Jōmon period have been found in the Date area. The Ainu, the native inhabitants of Hokkaido, also maintained a settlement at another location nearby until the beginning of the 20th century, when the Ainu were mostly assimilated into Japanese society.

The name of the area comes from the Date clan, who rose to power in the 12th century in Fukushima, on the mainland. Before the Edo period, their home castle was the Yanagawa castle in Date District, Fukushima. Later, it became the Sendai castle. The Date clan ruled the whole of Miyagi Prefecture as well as the southern part of Iwate Prefecture, and was one of the most influential daimyōs.

During the Meiji period, many samurai, including the Date clan, lost their territories due to the abolition of the han system. In 1869, a branch family of the Date clan from Watari-Date moved to and settled at the south coast of the then-uncultivated Hokkaido. This was the foundation of Date.

On March 1, 2006, the village of Ōtaki, from Usu District, was merged into Date.

== Geography ==
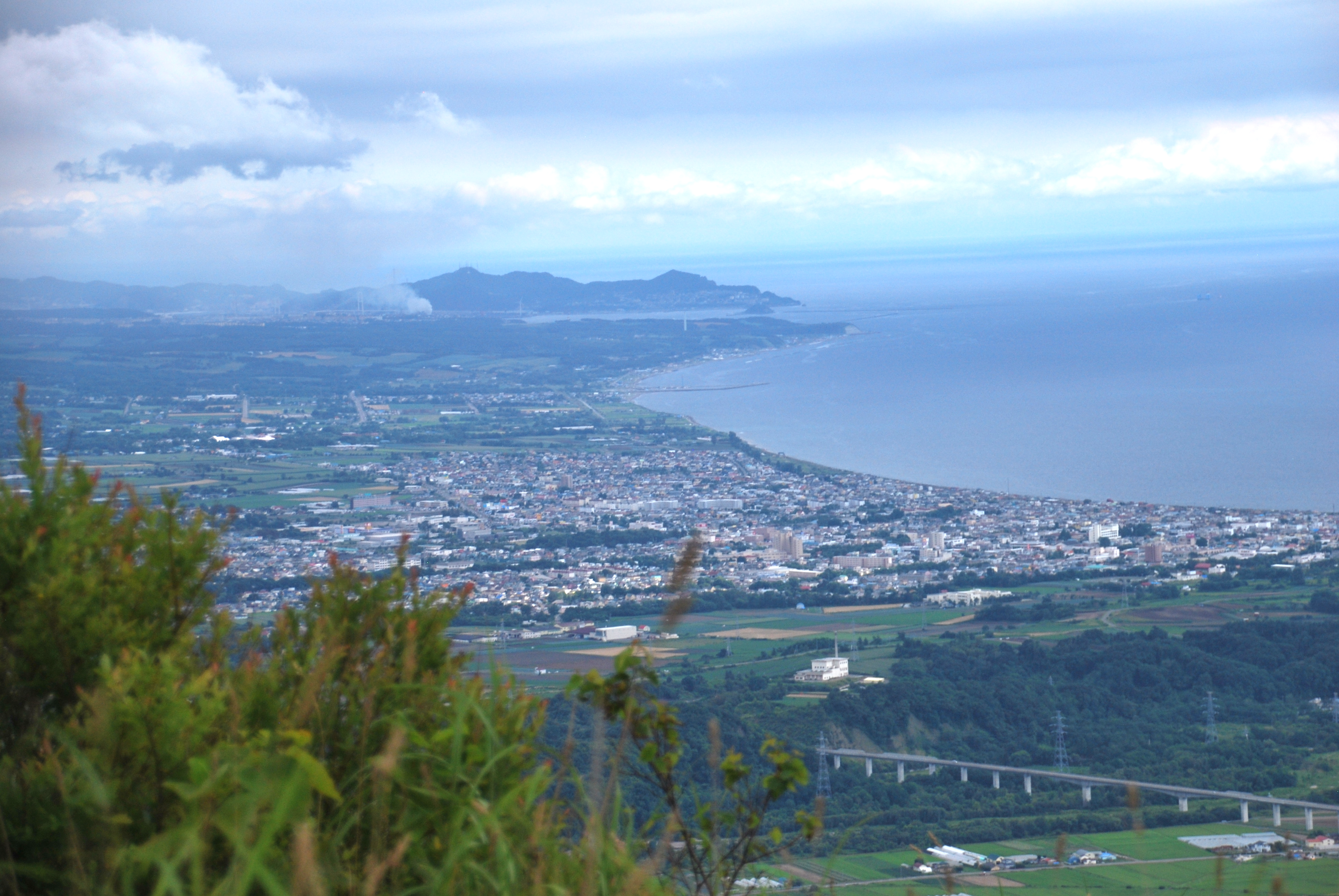
A view of Date from Mount Usu

Date is home to Mount Usu (702 metres (2,303 ft)) and the Osaru River.

As a result of city and village merges, Date can essentially be divided into two sections: the Otaki Forest area and the Date Historic City area. Otaki Forest is home to Sankaidaki Falls and the Shirakinu River Bed. Date Historic City contains buildings that were built by the samurai, the most famous of which is the Usu-Zenkou temple.

== Climate ==
Climate data for Date (elevation 3 m, 2008–2020 normals, extremes 2007–present)
Month	Jan	Feb	Mar	Apr	May	Jun	Jul	Aug	Sep	Oct	Nov	Dec	Year
Record high °C (°F)	9.9 (49.8)	15.0 (59.0)	15.9 (60.6)	21.9 (71.4)	29.4 (84.9)	28.9 (84.0)	31.9 (89.4)	33.5 (92.3)	32.6 (90.7)	25.6 (78.1)	21.1 (70.0)	14.6 (58.3)	33.5 (92.3)
Mean daily maximum °C (°F)	0.1 (32.2)	0.9 (33.6)	5.3 (41.5)	10.8 (51.4)	16.2 (61.2)	19.8 (67.6)	23.8 (74.8)	25.4 (77.7)	22.8 (73.0)	16.4 (61.5)	9.2 (48.6)	2.7 (36.9)	12.8 (55.0)
Daily mean °C (°F)	−2.9 (26.8)	−2.6 (27.3)	1.4 (34.5)	6.2 (43.2)	11.6 (52.9)	15.9 (60.6)	20.3 (68.5)	21.7 (71.1)	18.5 (65.3)	11.9 (53.4)	5.4 (41.7)	−0.3 (31.5)	8.9 (48.0)
Mean daily minimum °C (°F)	−6.8 (19.8)	−6.8 (19.8)	−2.8 (27.0)	1.2 (34.2)	7.1 (44.8)	12.4 (54.3)	17.3 (63.1)	18.4 (65.1)	14.1 (57.4)	7.1 (44.8)	1.3 (34.3)	−3.9 (25.0)	4.9 (40.8)
Record low °C (°F)	−16.7 (1.9)	−15.6 (3.9)	−11.5 (11.3)	−5.1 (22.8)	0.4 (32.7)	4.7 (40.5)	9.9 (49.8)	9.6 (49.3)	4.3 (39.7)	−2.3 (27.9)	−8.0 (17.6)	−14.2 (6.4)	−16.7 (1.9)
Average precipitation mm (inches)	19.2 (0.76)	17.7 (0.70)	36.6 (1.44)	60.1 (2.37)	63.1 (2.48)	66.2 (2.61)	97.7 (3.85)	118.6 (4.67)	97.6 (3.84)	77.6 (3.06)	70.2 (2.76)	44.7 (1.76)	769.3 (30.29)
Average precipitation days (≥ 1.0 mm)	6.0	5.4	7.1	8.3	7.6	7.4	8.5	9.4	9.1	10.6	10.2	8.7	98.2
Mean monthly sunshine hours	104.1	124.2	175.4	194.7	203.1	164.0	145.5	160.6	180.3	158.4	104.9	84.8	1,799.9
Source: Japan Meteorological Agency (2008–2020 normals, extremes 2007–present)

Climate data for Ōtaki, Date (elevation 390 m, 1991–2020 normals, extremes 1977–present)
Month	Jan	Feb	Mar	Apr	May	Jun	Jul	Aug	Sep	Oct	Nov	Dec	Year
Record high °C (°F)	6.4 (43.5)	12.4 (54.3)	17.8 (64.0)	25.1 (77.2)	29.9 (85.8)	32.5 (90.5)	32.4 (90.3)	33.1 (91.6)	30.3 (86.5)	26.1 (79.0)	18.9 (66.0)	10.9 (51.6)	33.1 (91.6)
Mean daily maximum °C (°F)	−3.1 (26.4)	−2.1 (28.2)	2.0 (35.6)	8.8 (47.8)	16.1 (61.0)	20.2 (68.4)	23.4 (74.1)	24.2 (75.6)	20.4 (68.7)	13.7 (56.7)	5.8 (42.4)	−1.1 (30.0)	10.7 (51.3)
Daily mean °C (°F)	−7.2 (19.0)	−6.6 (20.1)	−2.7 (27.1)	3.3 (37.9)	9.6 (49.3)	14.3 (57.7)	18.2 (64.8)	19.1 (66.4)	14.6 (58.3)	7.8 (46.0)	1.3 (34.3)	−4.8 (23.4)	5.6 (42.1)
Mean daily minimum °C (°F)	−12.2 (10.0)	−12.3 (9.9)	−8.1 (17.4)	−1.9 (28.6)	3.5 (38.3)	9.0 (48.2)	14.0 (57.2)	14.7 (58.5)	9.3 (48.7)	2.3 (36.1)	−3.1 (26.4)	−9.2 (15.4)	0.5 (32.9)
Record low °C (°F)	−24.9 (−12.8)	−24.7 (−12.5)	−21.4 (−6.5)	−16.3 (2.7)	−4.0 (24.8)	−1.4 (29.5)	2.4 (36.3)	4.8 (40.6)	−0.6 (30.9)	−5.9 (21.4)	−15.7 (3.7)	−22.0 (−7.6)	−24.9 (−12.8)
Average precipitation mm (inches)	100.6 (3.96)	84.9 (3.34)	96.1 (3.78)	100.7 (3.96)	123.9 (4.88)	81.3 (3.20)	137.4 (5.41)	187.0 (7.36)	178.6 (7.03)	152.8 (6.02)	147.0 (5.79)	122.0 (4.80)	1,513.7 (59.59)
Average snowfall cm (inches)	188 (74)	160 (63)	147 (58)	56 (22)	1 (0.4)	0 (0)	0 (0)	0 (0)	0 (0)	4 (1.6)	70 (28)	188 (74)	813 (320)
Average precipitation days (≥ 1.0 mm)	19.6	17.7	17.3	13.3	12.4	10.6	11.4	11.9	12.8	14.9	17.5	20.8	179.7
Mean monthly sunshine hours	44.1	59.4	100.6	160.2	190.7	168.0	137.1	139.6	142.4	126.1	72.3	39.8	1,378.2
Source: Japan Meteorological Agency (1991–2020 normals, extremes 1977–present)

== Demographics ==
Per Japanese census data, the population of Date has remained relatively steady over the past half-century.

Historical population
Year	Pop.	±%
1970	31,639	—
1980	36,309	+14.8%
1990	36,652	+0.9%
2000	37,139	+1.3%
2010	36,278	−2.3%
2020	32,826	−9.5%

== Education ==
=== High schools ===
- Hokkaido Date Kaiki High School

== Transportation ==
Date lies at the conjunction of National Highway Route 37 and Route 453. Date can be accessed via the Date Interchange from the expressway or via Date-Mombetsu Station operated by JR Hokkaido.

- Muroran Main Line: Usu - Nagawa - Date-Mombetsu - Kita-Funaoka - Mareppu - Kogane
- Hokkaido Expressway: Usuzan SA - Date IC

== Sister cities ==
- (Japan) Watari, Miyagi (sister town)
- (Japan) Shinchi, Fukushima (sister town)
- (Japan) Yamamoto, Miyagi (sister town)
- (Japan) Shibata, Miyagi (friendship town)
- Lake Cowichan, British Columbia, Canada (sister town)
- (Japan) Hirakata, Osaka (cultural exchanges)
- Zhangzhou, Fujian, China (sister city)

== See also ==
- Tozama daimyō
