= Datemombetsu Station =

Railway station in Date, Hokkaido, Japan

Coordinates: 42.4690°N 140.8566°E

Datemombetsu Station 伊達紋別駅
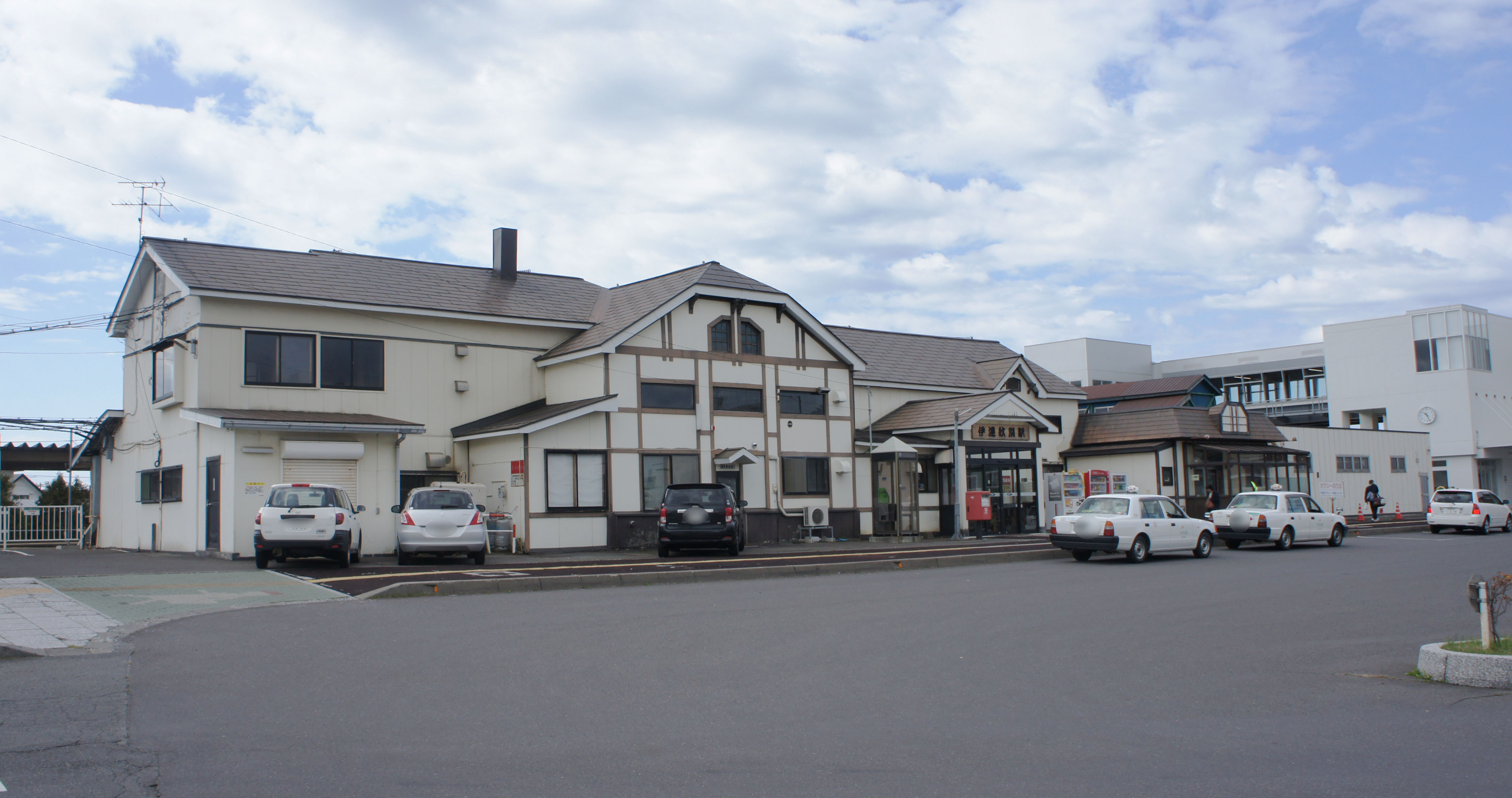
- Datemombetsu Station, October 2018

General information
- Location: Date, Hokkaido; Japan
- Operator: JR Hokkaido
- Line: Muroran Main Line

Other information
- Station code: H38

History
- Opened: 1925

Passengers
- FY2011: 1,219 daily
Location

Datemombetsu Station (伊達紋別駅, Datemonbetsu-eki) is a railway station on the Muroran Main Line in Date, Hokkaido, Japan, operated by Hokkaido Railway Company (JR Hokkaido).

== Lines ==
Datemombetsu Station is served by the Muroran Main Line, and is numbered "H38".

== Adjacent stations ==
«	Service	»
Muroran Main Line
Nagawa	-	Kita-Funaoka

== History ==
Datemombetsu Station opened on 20 August 1925. With the privatization of Japanese National Railways (JNR) on 1 April 1987, the station came under the control of JR Hokkaido.

== Passenger statistics ==
In fiscal 2011, the station was used by an average of 1,219 passengers daily. The passenger figures for previous years are as shown below.

Fiscal year	Daily average
1981	2,027
1992	2,810
2005	1,234
2006	1,056
2007	1,355
2008	1,368
2009	1,261
2010	1,346
2011	1,219

== See also ==
- List of railway stations in Japan
