= Sakimori Station =

Railway station in Muroran, Hokkaido, Japan

Coordinates: 42.3739°N 140.9269°E

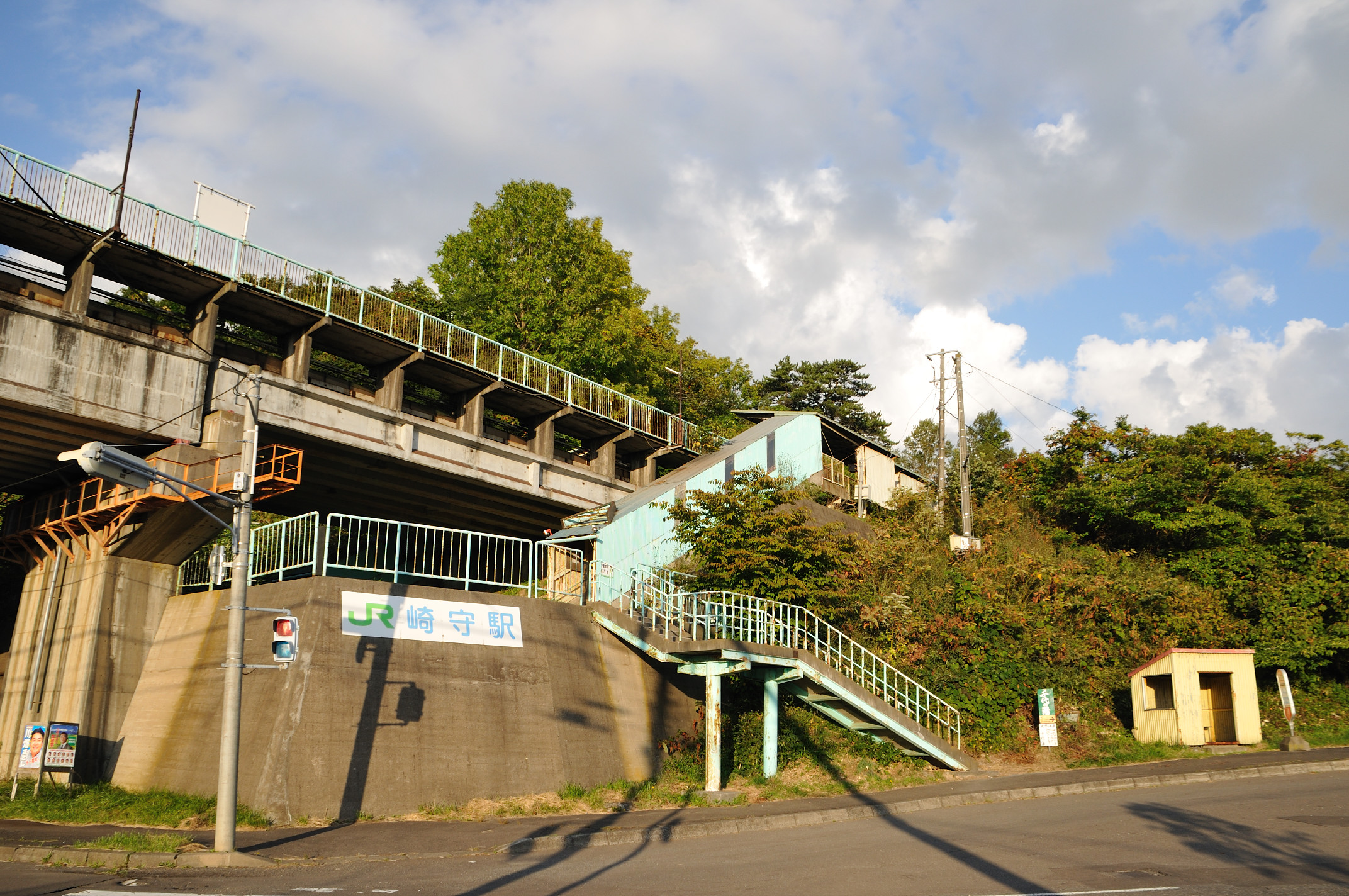
JR Hokkaido Sakimori station, Muroran, Hokkaido, Japan

Sakimori Station (崎守駅, Sakimori-eki) is a train station in Muroran, Hokkaidō, Japan.

== Lines ==
- Hokkaido Railway Company
  - Muroran Main Line Station H34

== Adjacent stations ==
«	Service	»
Muroran Main Line
Kogane	-	Moto-Wanishi
