= Usu Station =

Railway station in Date, Hokkaido, Japan

H40 Usu Station 有珠駅
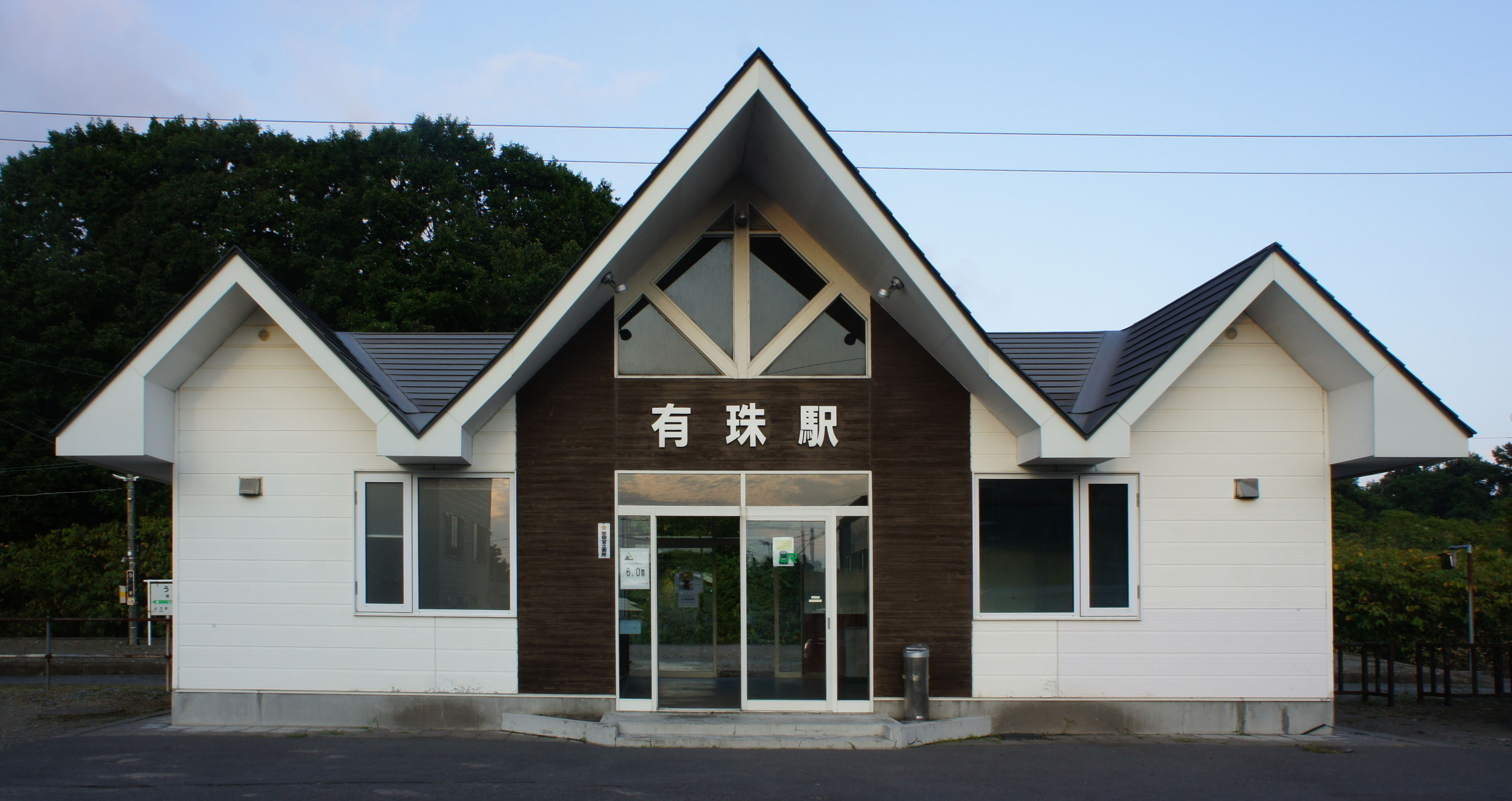

General information
- Location: Date, Hokkaidō, Japan
- Coordinates: 42.5129°N 140.7939°E
- Operator: JR Hokkaido
- Line: Muroran Main Line

Other information
- Station code: H40
Location

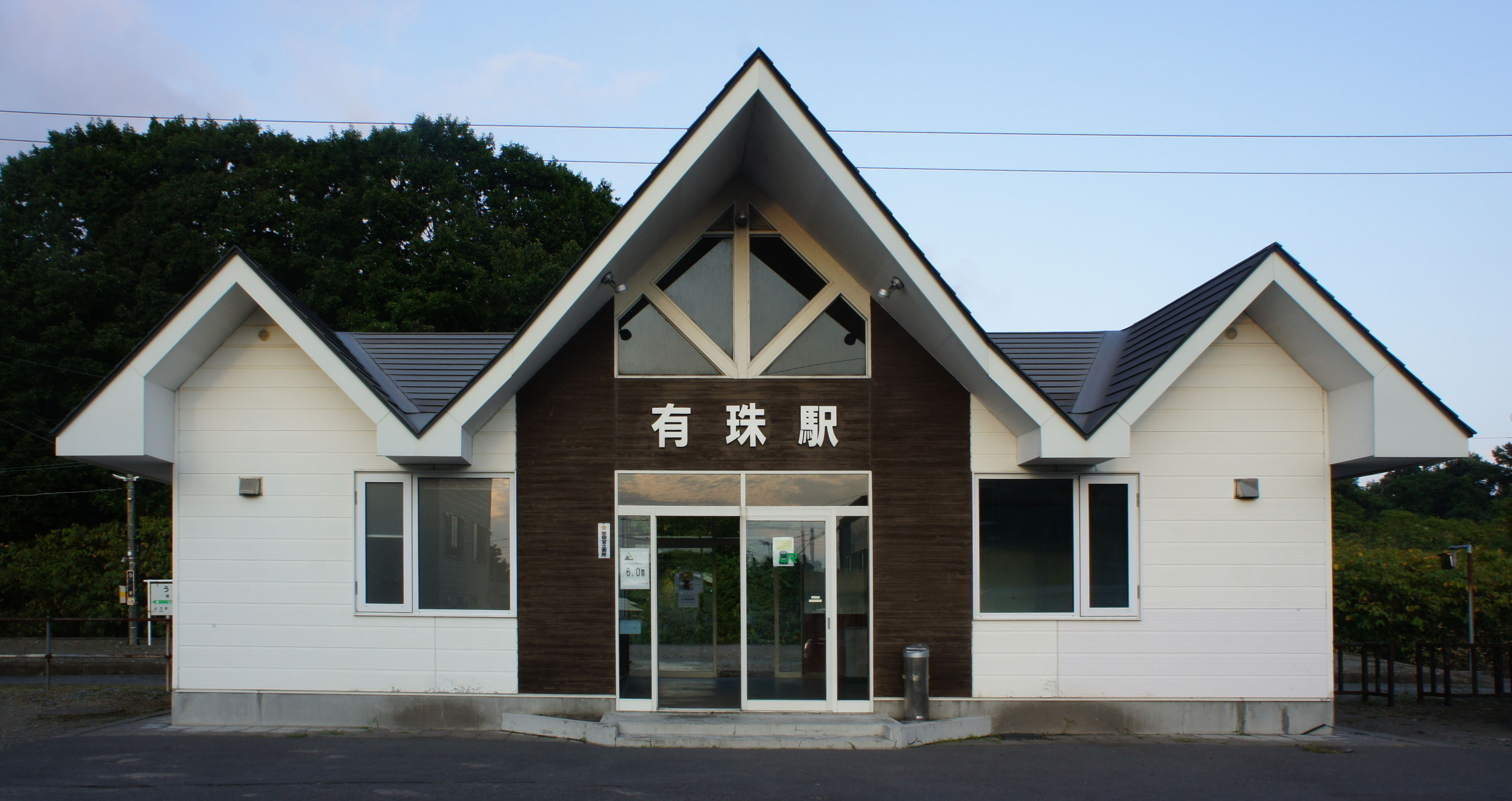
JR Muroran Main Line, Usu Station Building

Usu Station (有珠駅, Usu-eki) is a train station in Date, Hokkaidō, Japan.

== Lines ==
- Hokkaido Railway Company
  - Muroran Main Line Station H40

== Adjacent stations ==
«	Service	»
Muroran Main Line
Tōya	-	Nagawa
