= Kita-Funaoka Station =

Railway station in Date, Hokkaido, Japan

Coordinates: 42.4504°N 140.8805°E

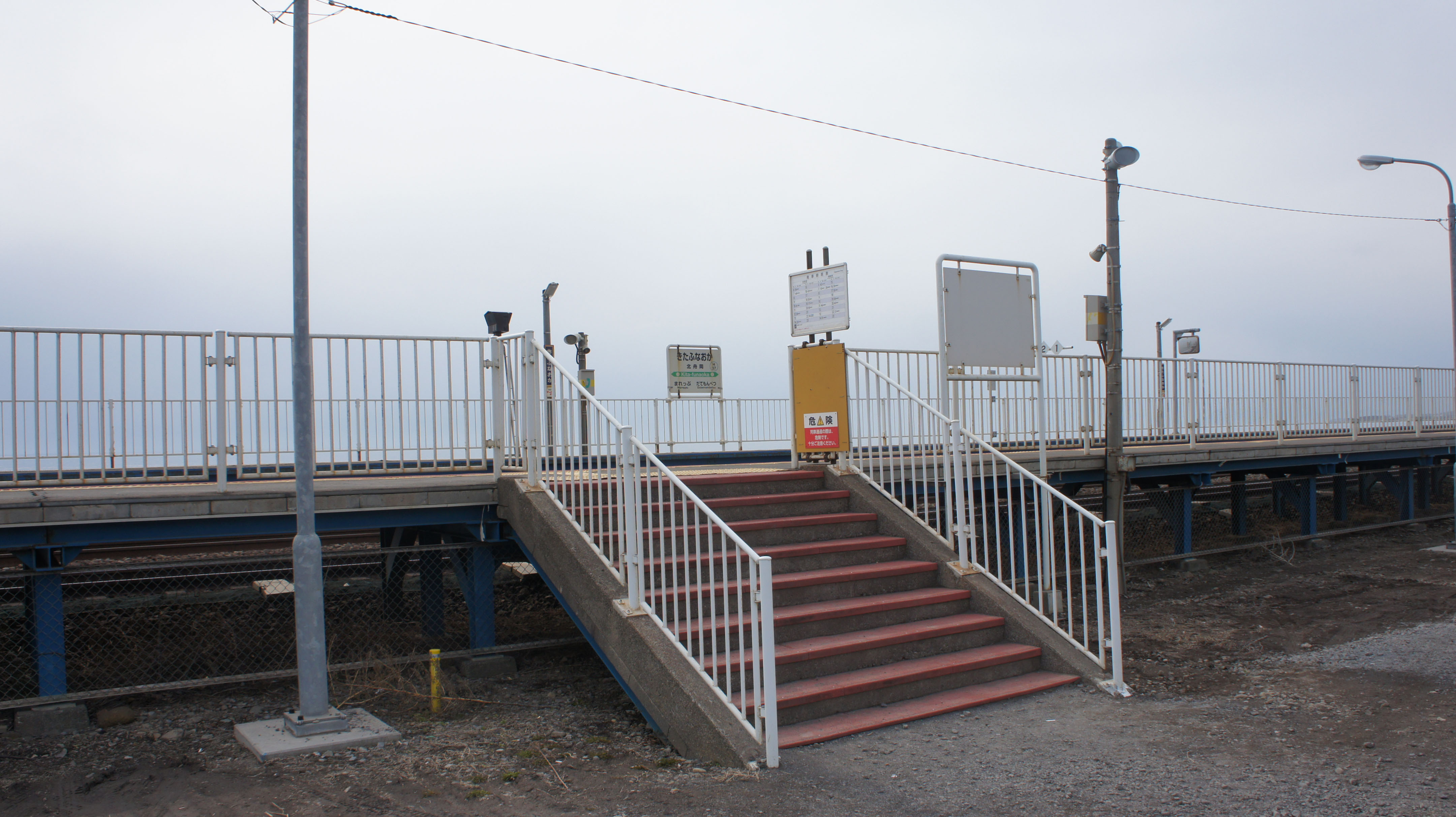
JR Hokkaido Muroran line Kita-Funaoka stn

Kita-Funaoka Station (北舟岡駅, Kita-Funaoka-eki) is a train station in Date, Hokkaidō, Japan.

== Lines ==
- Hokkaido Railway Company
  - Muroran Main Line Station H37

== Adjacent stations ==
«	Service	»
Muroran Main Line
Date-Mombetsu	-	Mareppu
