= Sōbetsu, Hokkaido =

Sōbetsu 壮瞥町
- Town
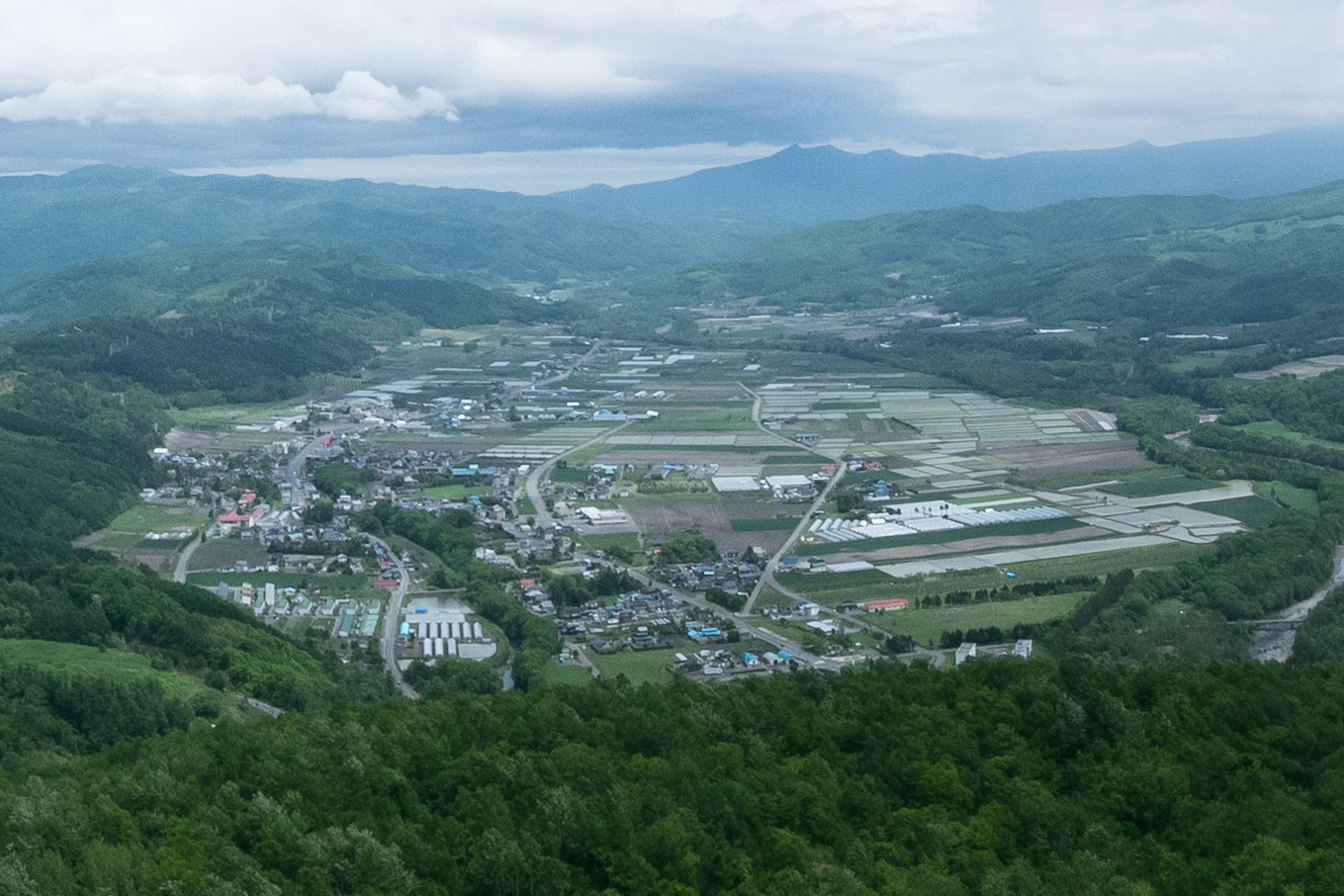
- Downtown Sōbetsu

- Flag Seal

- Location of Sōbetsu in Hokkaido (Iburi Subprefecture)

- Location in Japan
- Coordinates: 42°33′16″N 140°53′10″E
- Country: Japan
- Region: Hokkaido
- Prefecture: Hokkaido (Iburi Subprefecture)
- District: Usu

Area
  - Total: 205.04 km^{2} (79.17 sq mi)

Population (October 1, 2020)
  - Total: 2,743
  - Density: 13.38/km^{2} (34.65/sq mi)
- Time zone: UTC+09:00 (JST)
- Website: www.town.sobetsu.lg.jp

Sōbetsu (壮瞥町, Sōbetsu-chō) is a town located in Iburi Subprefecture, Hokkaido, Japan.

As of October 2020, the town has an estimated population of 2,743, and a density of 13 persons per km^{2}. The total area is 205.04 km^{2}.

It is home of the Showa Shinzan Yukigassen Tournament, a major Japanese snowball fight tournament.

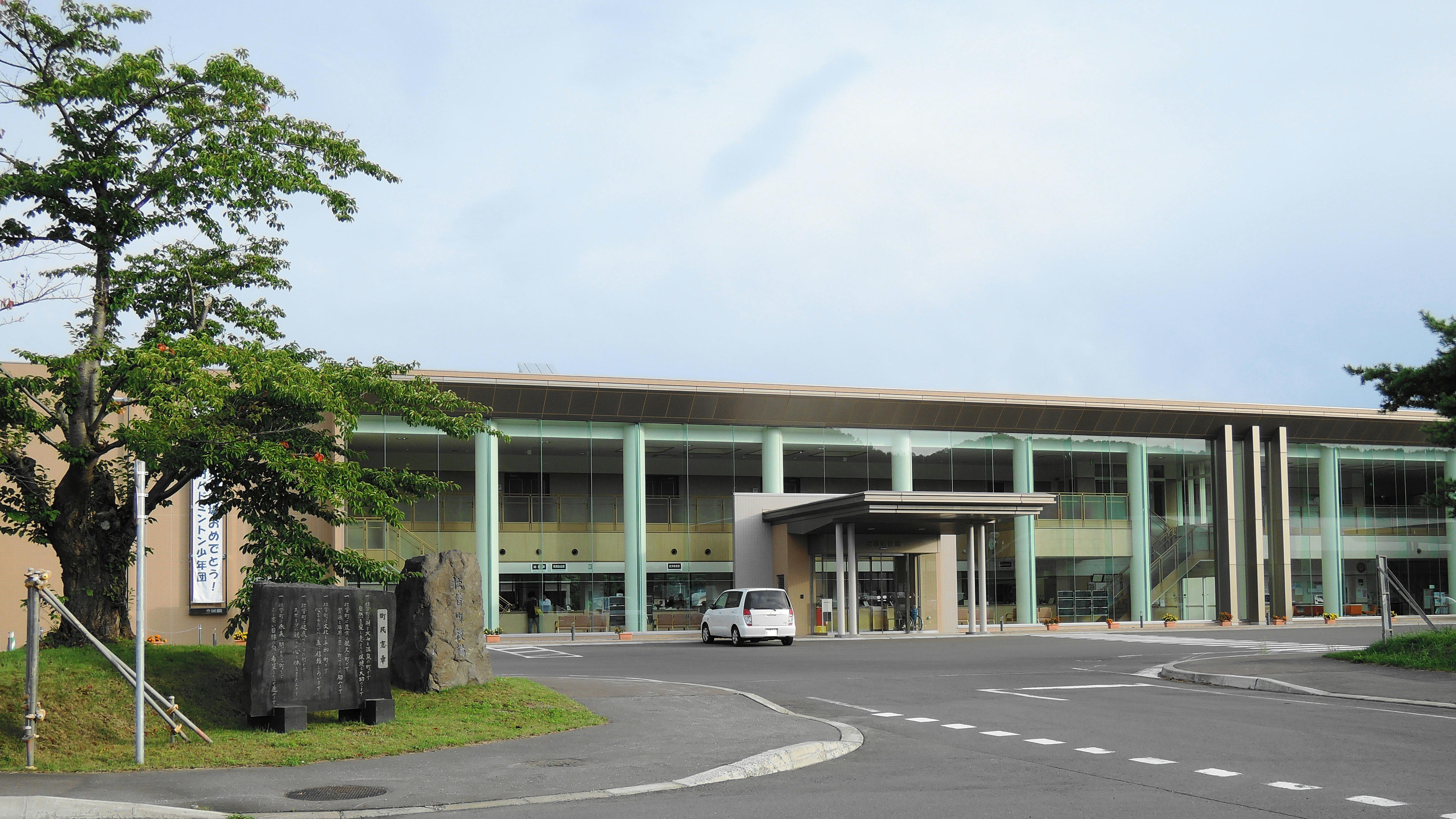
Sōbetsu Town hall

== Notable people from Sōbetsu ==
- Kitanoumi Toshimitsu, sumo wrestler
