= Nagawa Station =

Railway station in Date, Hokkaido, Japan

H39 Nagawa Station 長和駅
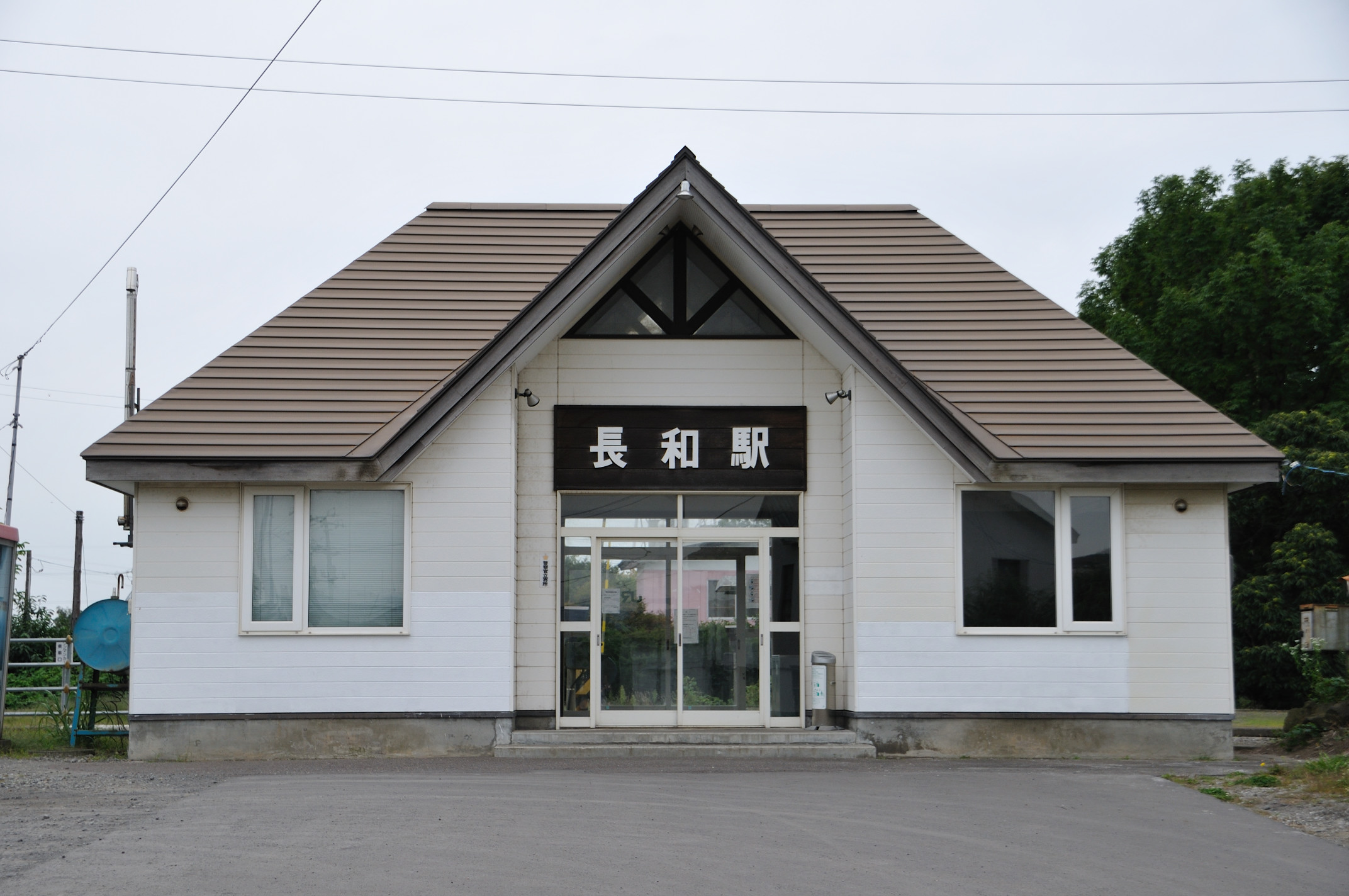
- Hokkaido Nagawa station, Hokkaido, Japan in 2009

General information
- Location: Date, Hokkaidō; Japan
- Coordinates: 42.4885°N 140.8336°E
- Operator: JR Hokkaido
- Line: Muroran Main Line

Other information
- Station code: H39
Location

Nagawa Station (長和駅, Nagawa-eki) is a train station in Date, Hokkaidō, Japan.

== Lines ==
- Hokkaido Railway Company
  - Muroran Main Line Station H39

== Adjacent stations ==
«	Service	»
Muroran Main Line
Usu	-	Datemombetsu
