= Edinburgh snowball riots of 1838 =

Civil disorder in Edinburgh, Scotland

Edinburgh 1838 snowball riots
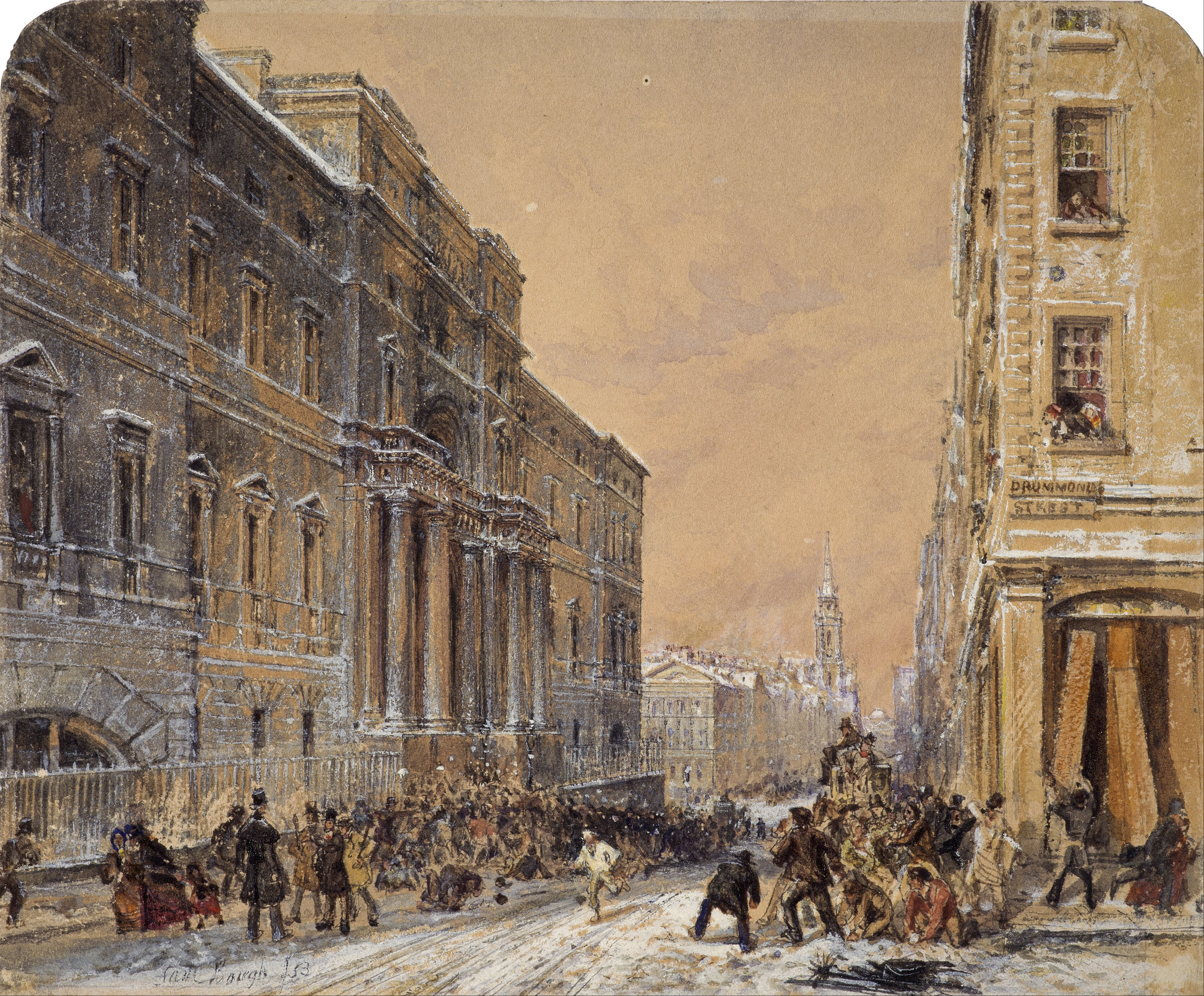
- Date: 11–12 January 1838
- Duration: Two days
- Venue: Old College, Edinburgh
- Location: Edinburgh, Scotland
- Also known as: The Wars of the Quadrangle

The Edinburgh snowball riot of 1838 also known as the Wars of the Quadrangle occurred when University of Edinburgh students engaged in a two-day 'battle' with local Edinburgh residents which led to violent suppression by armed police.

== Background ==
On a Thursday afternoon on 11 January 1838, a group of students and local tradesmen began throwing snowballs at one another in front of the University's Old College at South Bridge. This was described as beginning in "a spirit of harmless amusement".

In its reporting, The Scotsman newspaper describes how things then escalated with the students targeting passersby and started to lob snowballs to smash tenement windows on the opposite side of the street. The police were called and the detained students agreed to a ceasefire. This did not last long, however.

The students resumed their snowball fights, but this time added rocks to the snowballs and also armed themselves with real weapons.

"No sooner were the prisoners released than they to the amount of about 300, met in the quadrangle of the College, and came to a resolution to renew the disturbances on the following day, and to arm themselves with bludgeons and other weapons for the occasion." - The Scotsman

On Friday 12 January 1838, the students assembled outside the Old College and barricaded themselves behind the Old College's gates in order to launch an uninterrupted barrage of snowballs across the street. This time with more ferocity and "frequently with stones in the heart of them – for hours together, breaking an immense number of panes of glass in the windows on the opposite side, and severely wounding passengers."

Local shops were forced to close and put up their shutters to protect themselves from damage. The police were called in again and around 3pm that afternoon arrived en masse to force their way through the barricades and quell the student rioters. 37 were arrested and taken to the police station.

Then at 3:30pm, the Lord Provost and Magistrates arrived at Old College to appeal to the remaining students to end the riot. This was unsuccessful. The students refused.

The 79th Regiment was then called down from Edinburgh Castle by the Lord Provost. Faced with the military and their muskets and fixed bayonets, the students were made to finally disperse as evening drew in.

During the later evening, there were still small pockets of disturbances as snowball fights and windows continued to be smashed along South Bridge. However, no further serious disturbance was noted and the day's events concluded.

== Aftermath ==
Following the arrests, it was reported that the students had agreed to pool together to create 'a fighting fund' among themselves with a view to remunerate those fined by the Magistrates in court.

Of those detained, five students were put on trial: Charles John Dalrymple, Alfred Westmacott, John Aikenhead, Edward Kellet, and Robert Scot Skirving. All of these students were acquitted.

The students also published an extensive and humorous riposte entitled The University Snowdrop: a descriptive of the Wars of the Quadrangle and the Consequences thereof which opened as follows:

“The noblest theme of the noblest poets, in all ages, has been WAR”

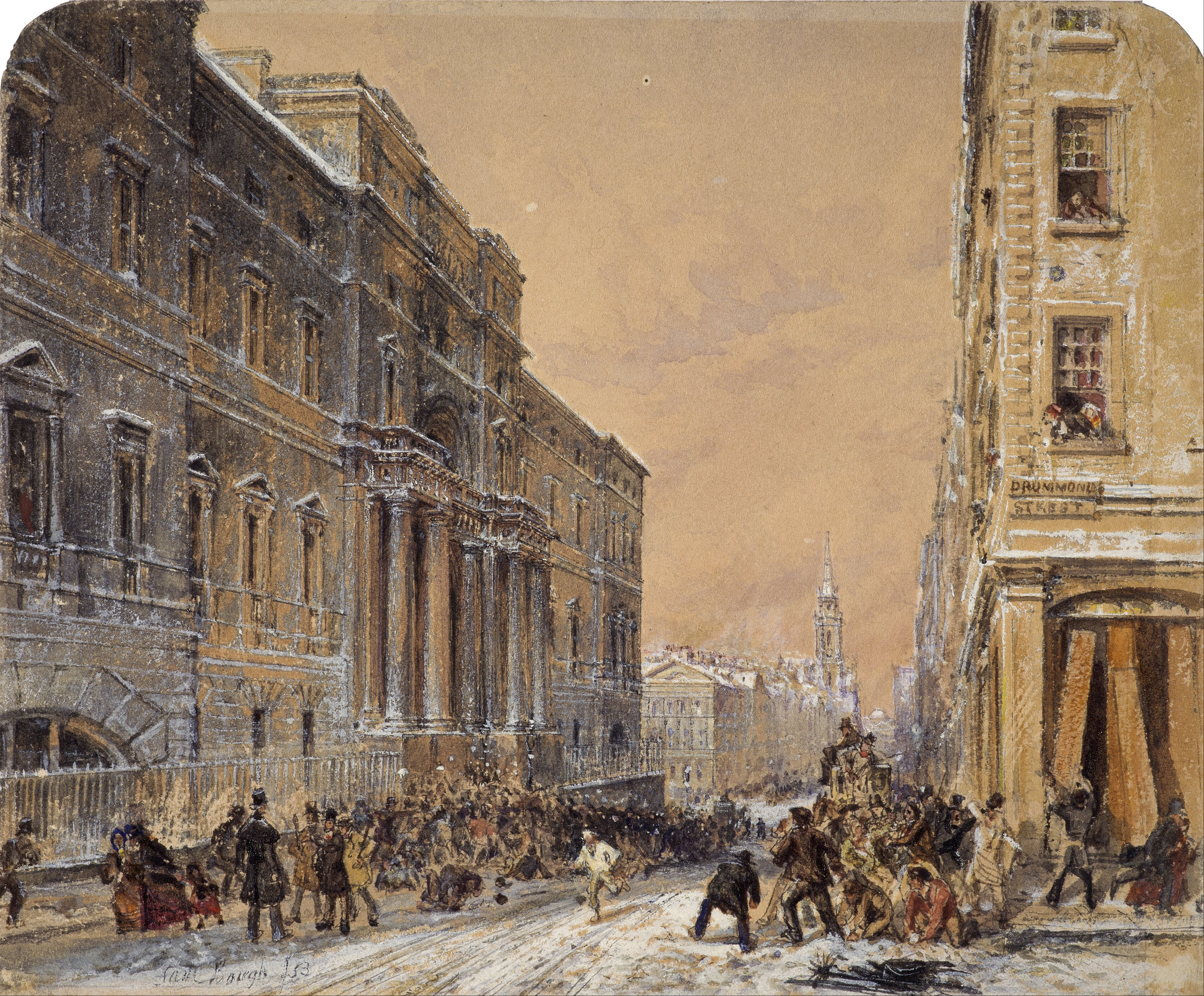
Snowballing Outside Edinburgh University (1853) - Samuel Bough

This thesis then goes on to advance that Homer’s Iliad and Odyssey:

“the evident result of a snow-ball fight at the village of Troy in Asia Minor”.

Images from The University Snowdrop
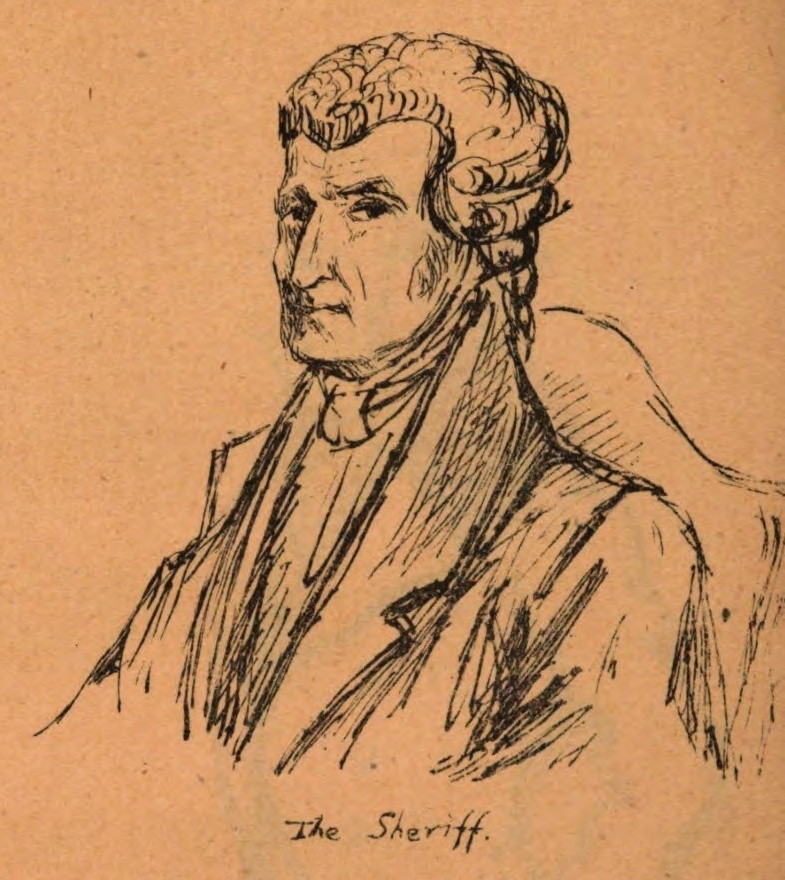
the Sheriff

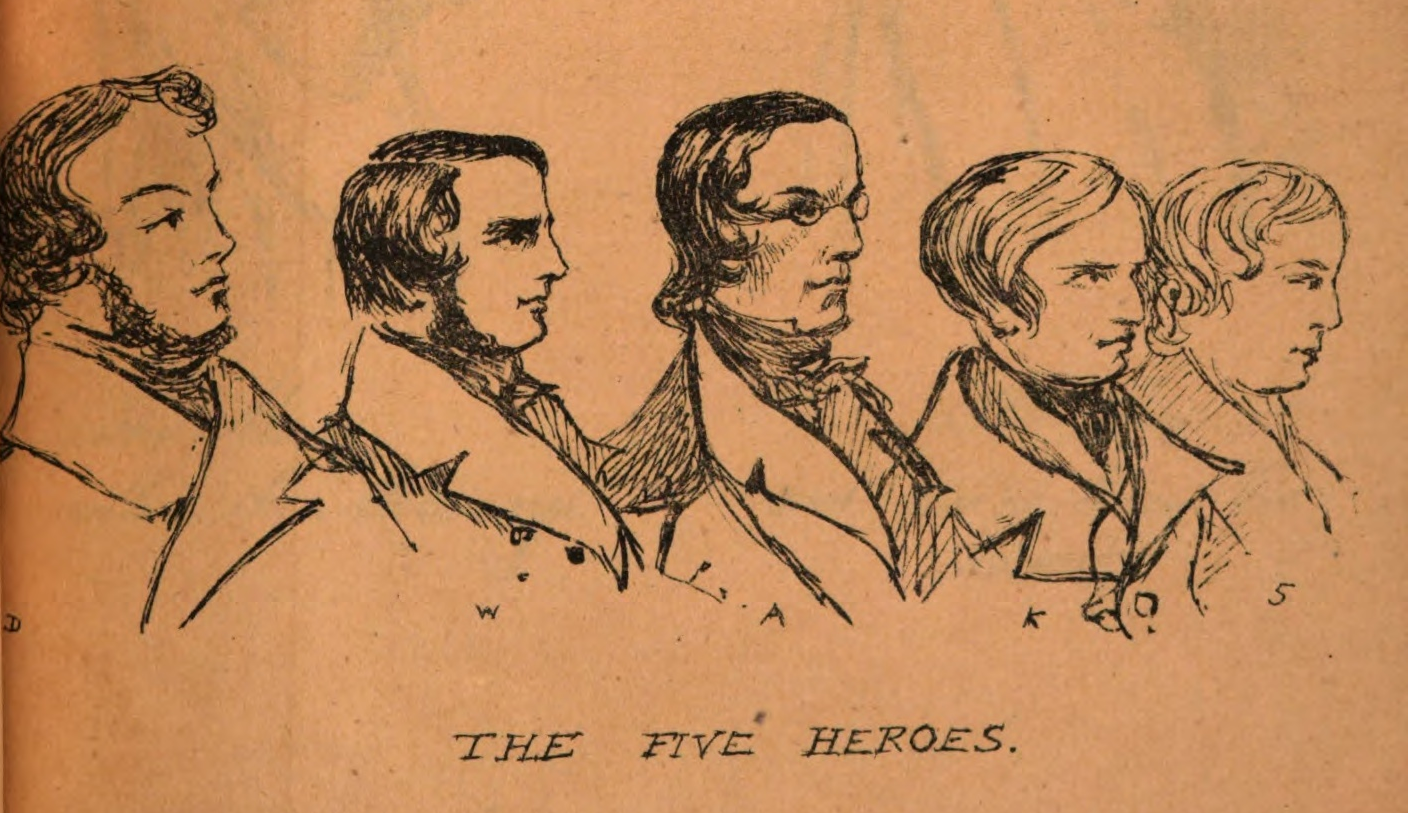
'The five heroes'

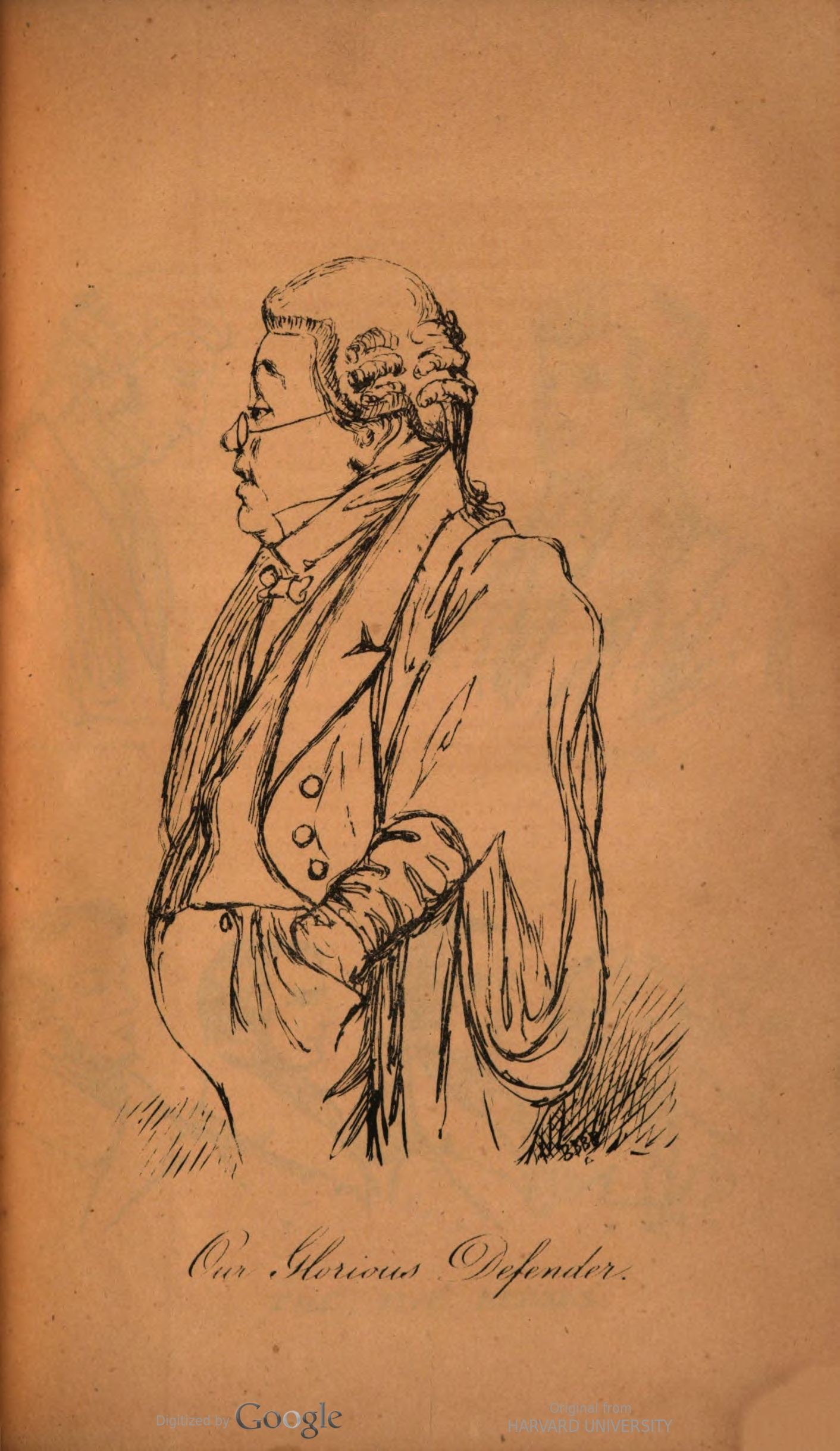
"Our Glorious Defender"

== Legacy ==
The English landscape artist Samuel Bough immortalised the 1838 snowball riots in a watercolour painting in 1853.
