= Kogane Station (Hokkaido) =

Railway station in Date, Hokkaido, Japan

Coordinates: 42°23′12″N 140°54′29″E

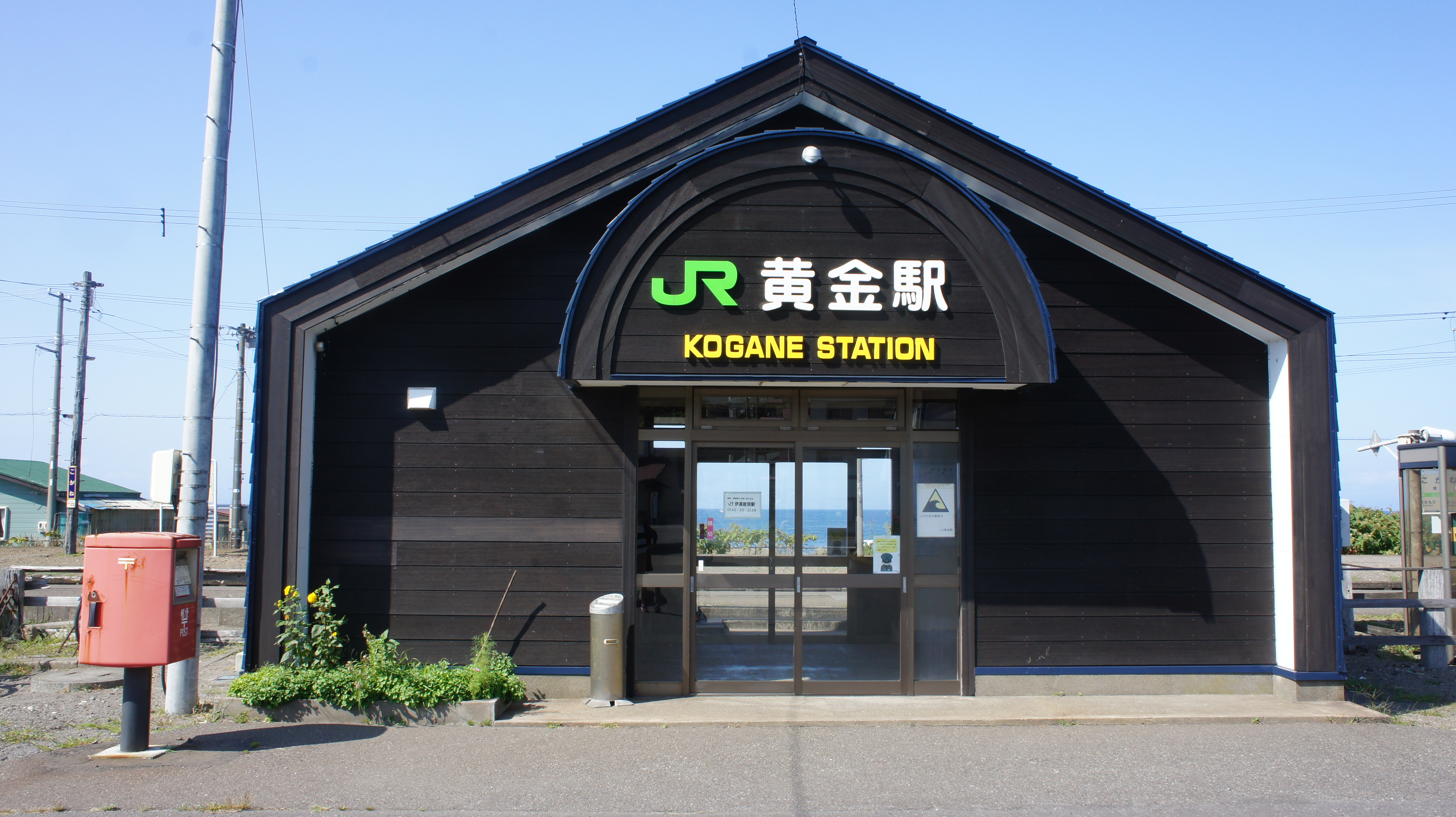
JR Muroran-Main-Line Kogane Station building

Kogane Station (黄金駅, Kogane-eki) is a train station in Date, Hokkaidō, Japan.

== Lines ==
- Hokkaido Railway Company
  - Muroran Main Line Station H35

== Adjacent stations ==
«	Service	»
Muroran Main Line
Mareppu	-	Sakimori
