= Bataille de neige =

1897 film produced by the Lumière brothers

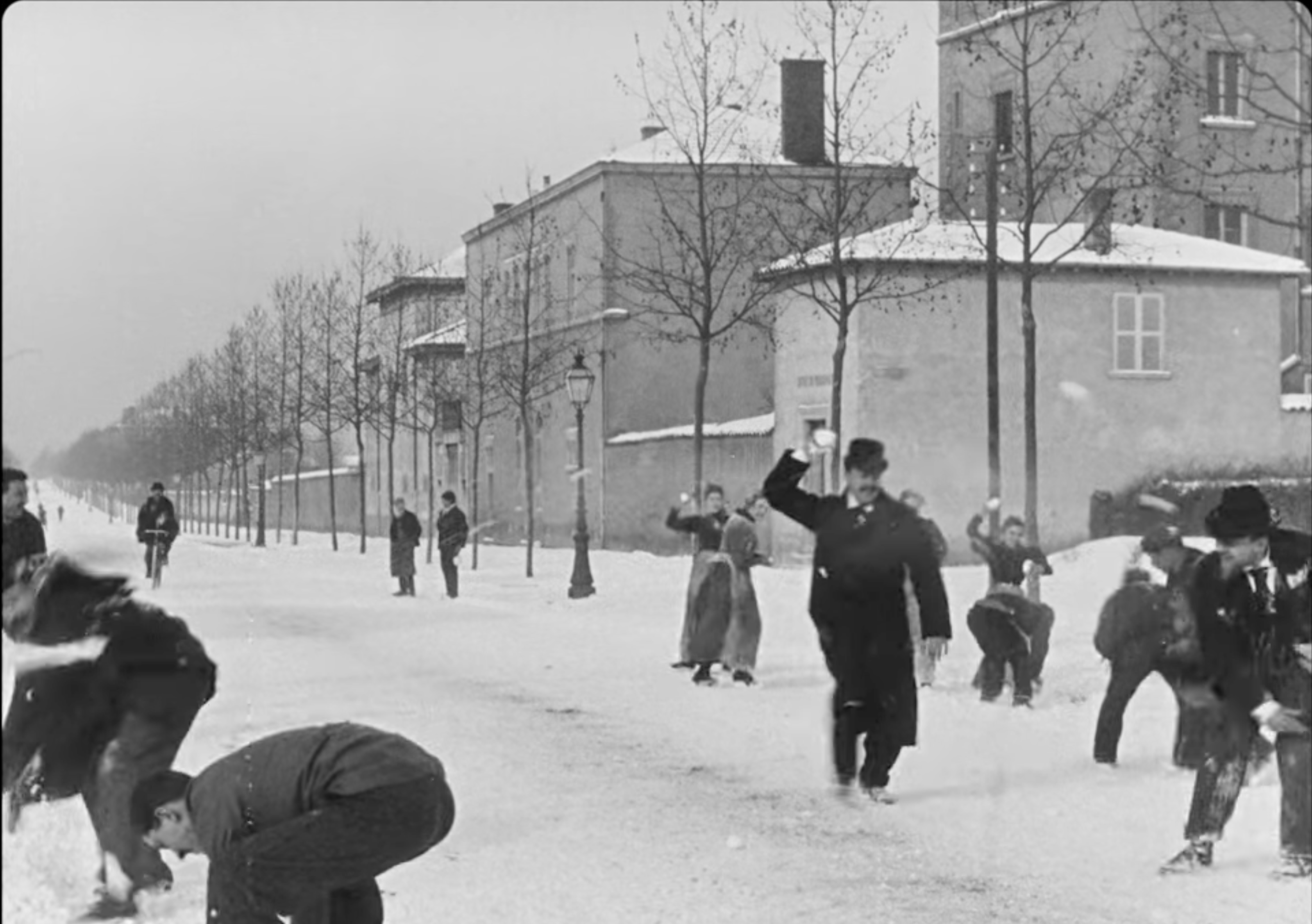
- Directed by: Unknown
- Produced by: Lumière brothers
- Release date: 1897
- Country: France
- Language: Silent

Bataille de neige (transl. Snow Fight), also known as Snowballing, is an 1897 French short silent film produced by the Lumiére brothers. Filmed in Lyon, France, it depicts a number of individuals engaged in a snowball fight on a city street.

== Plot ==
Bataille de neige (1897)

The camera is centered on a pathway made through a snow-covered city street. On both side of the pathway, several men and women are engaged in a snowball fight. A cyclist rides into the path of the fight, and is hit by snowballs, causing him to lose control of his bicycle and fall to the ground. His cap is flung onto the pathway. One male participant in the engagement grabs hold of the cyclist's bicycle and lifts it off the ground, and the fallen cyclist scrambles to his feet and yanks his bicycle away from the participant. After retrieving possession of his bicycle, the cyclist climbs back atop it and rides away.

== Production ==
Bataille de neige was shot in Lyon, France, with a cinématographe, an all-in-one camera, which also served as a film projector and developer. As with all early Lumière movies, this film was made in a 35 mm format with an aspect ratio of 1.33:1.

== Current status ==
Given its age, the copyright on this short film has expired. It is featured in a number of film collections, including The Movies Begin – A Treasury of Early Cinema, 1894–1913. In 2020, The New York Times published a feature article about the film, written by Sam Anderson, after a Russian amateur film restorer posted a cleaned-up and colourized version of the film to YouTube. Anderson described the result as "shockingly modern".
