= Japan National Route 37 =

National highway in Hokkaido, Japan

National Route 37
- 国道37号
- Japan National Route 37 highlighted in red

Route information
- Length: 81.1 km (50.4 mi)
- Existed: 4 December 1952–present

Major junctions
- West end: National Route 5 / National Route 230 in Oshamambe
- Dō-Ō Expressway; National Route 230; National Route 453
- East end: National Route 36 in Muroran

Location
- Country: Japan

Highway system
- National highways of Japan; Expressways of Japan
← National Route 36	→ National Route 38

National Route 37 (国道37号, Kokudō Sanjūnana-gō) is a Japanese national highway connecting Oshamambe and Muroran in southwestern Hokkaido. The 81.1-kilometer-long (50.4 mi) highway begins at an intersection with national routes 5 and 230 in the town of Oshamambe. It travels along the northern side of Uchiura Bay, paralleling the Dō-Ō Expressway. At the eastern edge of the bay it enters the city of Muroran where it ends at an intersection with National Route 36.

== Route description ==
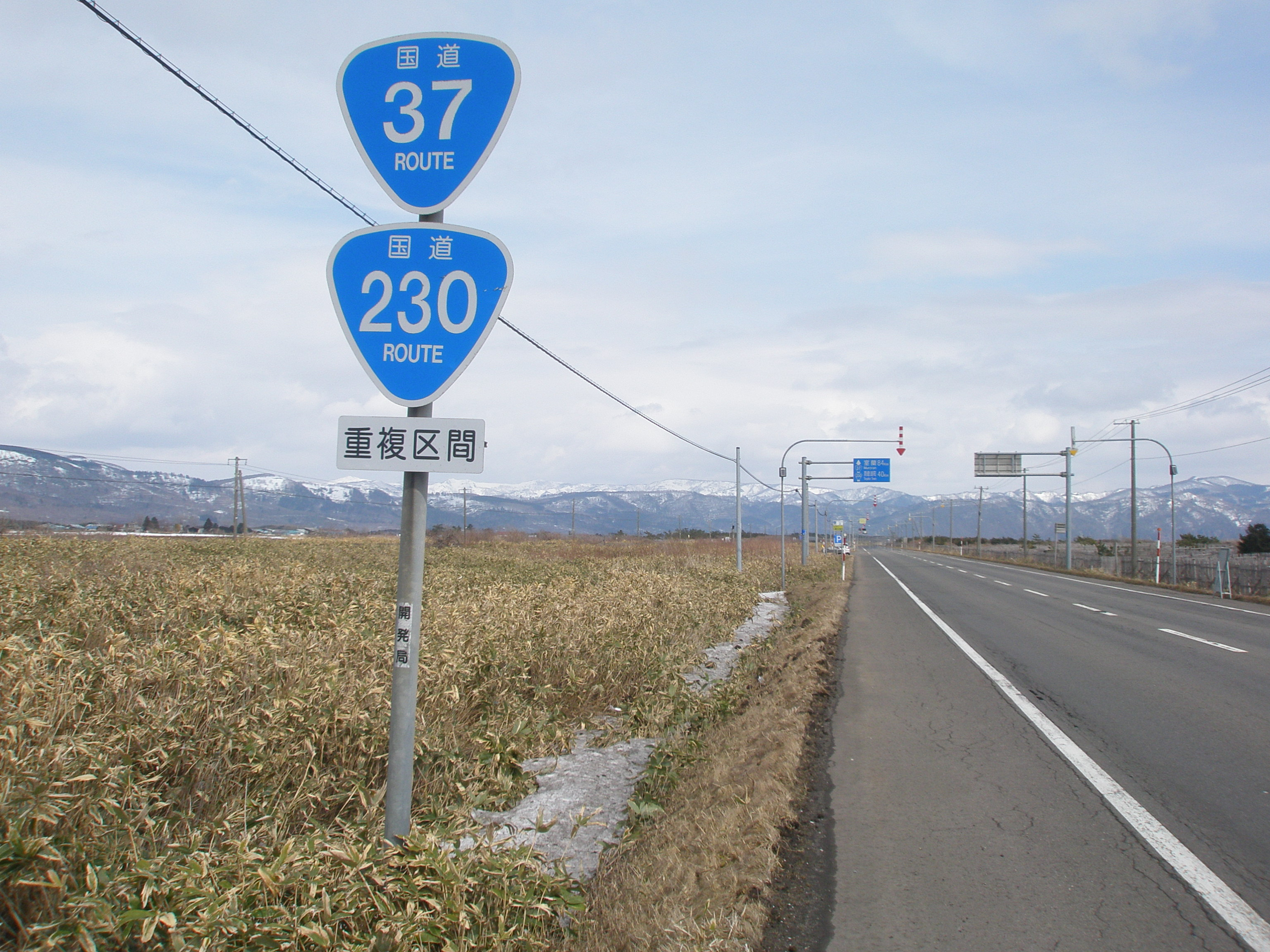
National Route 37 running concurrent with National Route 230 in Oshamambe

National Route 37 is an 81.1-kilometer-long (50.4 mi) highway in southwestern Hokkaido that runs east from Oshamambe to Muroran. Its eastern terminus lies at an intersection in central Oshamambe where it meets national routes 5 and 230. From there national routes 37 and 230 travel together paralleling the coastline of Uchiura Bay and the Dō-Ō Expressway. Along the way from Oshamambe to Muroran, it passes through the towns of Toyoura and Tōyako and the city of Date. National Route 230 leaves National Route 37 in Toyoura traveling north to Lake Tōya and Sapporo. Shortly after crossing in to Muroran, the route splits from the Hakuchō Shindō, a bypass of National Route 37 that crosses the Hakuchō Bridge to the tip of Cape Chikiu and central Muroran, while the main route continues to eastern Muroran. National Route 37's eastern terminus in eastern Muroran is at an intersection where it meets National Route 36.

== History ==
On 4 December 1952 the route was designated as Primary National Highway 37 between Oshamambe and Muroran. On 1 April 1965 the highway's designation was revised along with the other primary routes as General National Highway 37. When Mount Usu erupted on 31 March 2000, the town of Abuta was left with only National Route 37 as an evacuation route when the Dō-Ō Expressway closed.

== Major junctions ==
The route lies entirely within Hokkaido.

Location	km	mi	Destinations	Notes
Oshamambe	0.0	0.0	National Route 5 / National Route 230 west – to Dō-Ō Expressway, Hakodate, Yakumo, Otaru, Kutchan	Western terminus; western end of National Route 230 concurrency
Kuromatsunai	14.2	8.8	Hokkaido Route 266 west – to Kuromatsunai Shindō, central Kuromatsunai	
Toyoura	23.5	14.6	Hokkaido Route 344 west Hokkaido Route 609 south – Rebun Station	
Toyoura	29.4	18.3	Hokkaido Route 32 north Hokkaido Route 608 west – Ōkishi Station	
Toyoura	29.8	18.5	Dō-Ō Expressway – Hakodate, Sapporo	E5 exit 13 (Toyoura Interchange)
Toyoura	36.1	22.4	Hokkaido Route 702 – Niseko, Rankoshi	One-quadrant interchange
Toyoura	38.2	23.7	Hokkaido Route 97 north – Makkari	
Tōyako	41.6	25.8	National Route 230 east – to Dō-Ō Expressway, Sapporo, Tōyako Spa	Eastern end of National Route 230 concurrency
Tōyako	43.4	27.0	Hokkaido Route 578 north – Tōyako Onsen, Nishiyama Crater	
Date	47.8	29.7	Hokkaido Route 386 east – Usu Station	
Date	52.9	32.9	National Route 453 north – Kitayuzawa, Sōbetsu; Hokkaido Route 779 south – Nagawa Industrial Park	
Date	53.0	32.9	Hokkaido Route 385 west	
Date	56.1	34.9	Hokkaido Route 519 north – Sōbetsu; Hokkaido Route 982 south – Datemombetsu Station	
Date	57.1	35.5	Hokkaido Route 145 north – to Dō-Ō Expressway	
Date	59.4	36.9	Hokkaido Route 981	
Date	62.3	38.7	Hokkaido Route 1057 west – Mareppu Station	
Date	65.8	40.9	Hokkaido Route 779 north	
Muroran	67.9	42.2	Hokkaido Route 107 (Muroran Belt Route) east – to Dō-Ō Expressway	
Muroran	69.3	43.1	Hokkaido Route 704 west	
Muroran	72.6	45.1	National Route 37 east (Hakuchō Shindō) – to Dō-Ō Expressway, Muroran Station, Hakuchō Bridge	
Muroran	73.9	45.9	Hokkaido Route 127 north – to Dō-Ō Expressway	
Muroran	79.0	49.1	Hokkaido Route 919 east	
Muroran	80.7	50.1	Hokkaido Route 107 (Muroran Belt Route) east – Higashi-Muroran Station; Hokkaido Route 919 west – Wanishi	
Muroran	81.1	50.4	National Route 36 – to Dō-Ō Expressway, Tomakomai, Noboribetsu, Muroran Station, Cape Chikiu	Eastern terminus
1.000 mi = 1.609 km; 1.000 km = 0.621 mi: Concurrency terminus

== Auxiliary routes ==
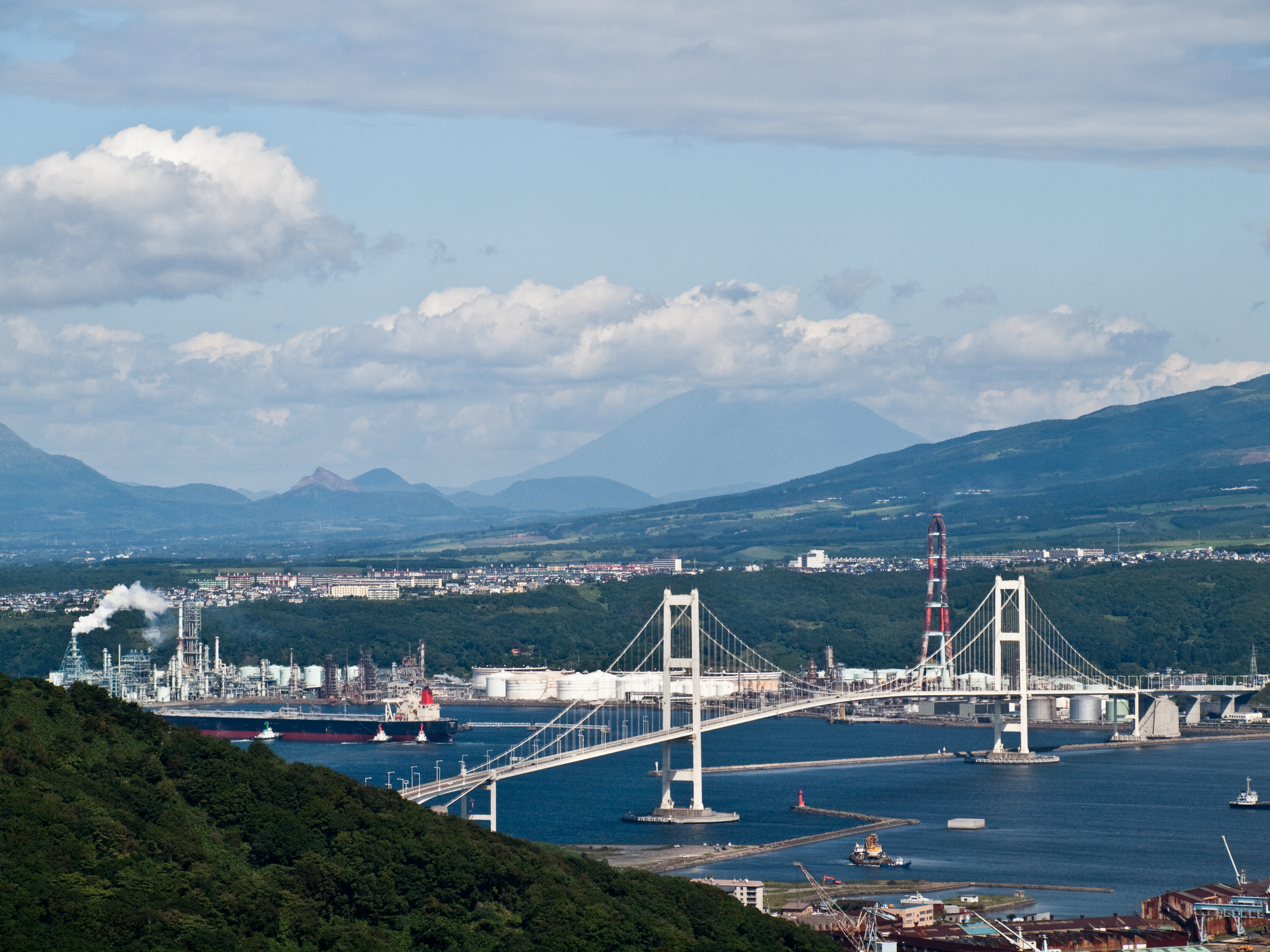
The Hakuchō Bridge

=== Hakuchō Shindō ===
The Hakuchō Shindō is a 6.97-kilometer-long (4.33 mi) auxiliary route of National Route 37 in the city of Muroran that crosses the Hakuchō Bridge to the tip of Cape Chikiu. It serves as central Muroran's primary arterial highway, whereas the main route serves eastern Muroran.
