= Akkorokamui =

Gigantic octopus-like monster from Ainu folklore

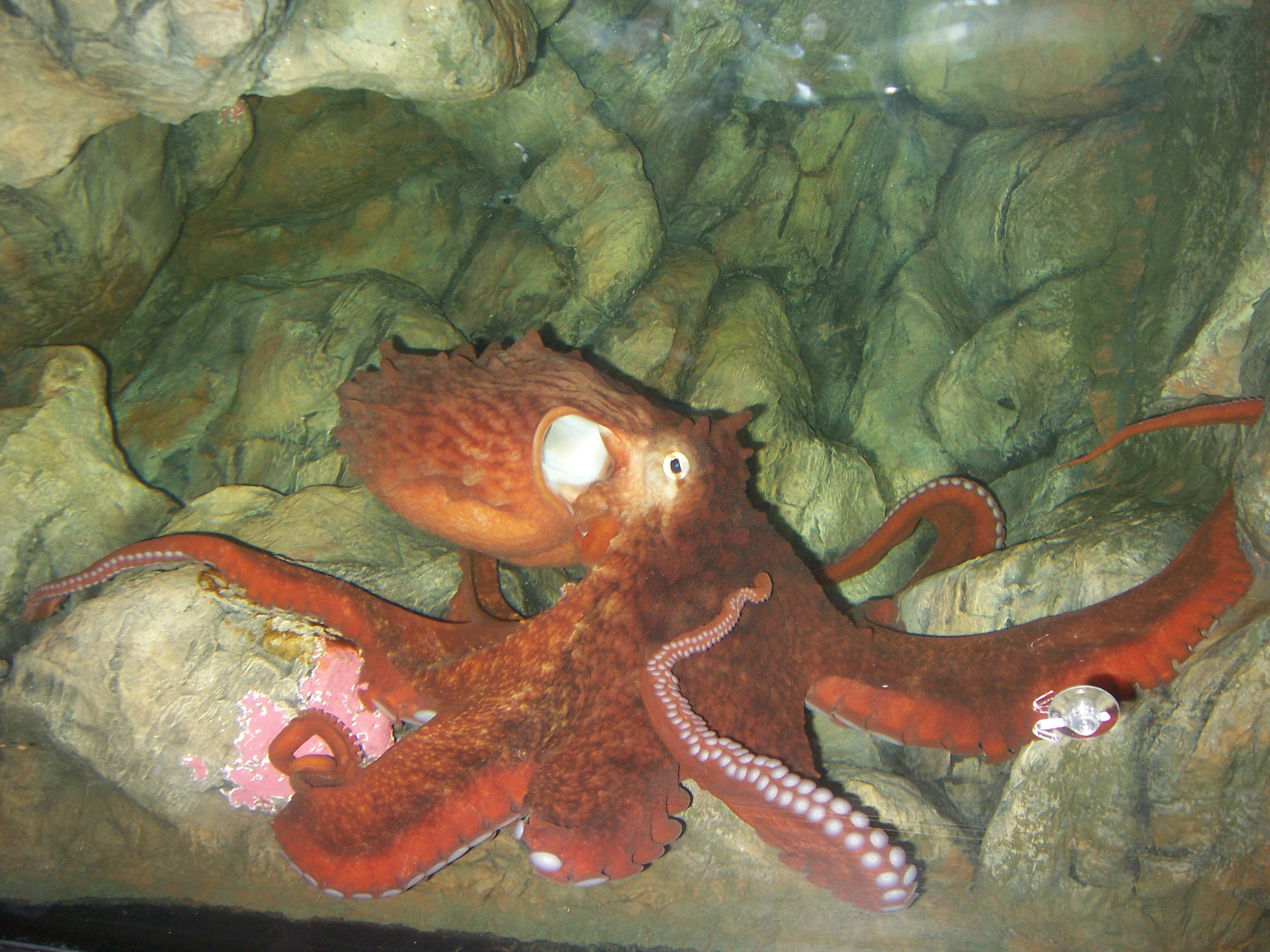
A giant Pacific octopus (Enteroctopus dofleini), the species thought to have inspired the legend of the Akkorokaumi.

Akkorokamui (Japanese: アッコロカムイ; Ainu: At-kor-kamuy) is a gigantic octopus-like monster from Ainu folklore, similar to the Nordic kraken, which supposedly lurks in Uchiura Bay in Hokkaido.

It is said that its enormous body can reach sizes of up to 1 hectare (110,000 square feet) or roughly 100 metres (330 feet) or more across. (Note: Yoshida's source stated it was as large 1 chō crop field in traditional Japanese measurements, equivalent to 1 hectare metric which would be 100m x 100m square if a square plot. A circle of this area will be of 113 metres (371 feet) diameter.)

== Nomenclature ==
In Ainu language, atkoro-guru, at-koro-guru, at kor [kur] (Note: Japanese: アッコログル.) is "octopus", where at refers to "string, strip, strand", so that at-koro-guru is literally "something which has thin strands". Hence at-kor-kamuy, atkor-kamuy also literally translates to "kamuy which has strings (tentacles)".

Sometimes the monster is represented in kanji as 大章魚 which would normally be read ōdako meaning "giant octopus".

Another common noun term for "octopus" in Ainu is atuina or atui-[i]nau (Note: Japanese: アッウィナ, アトイナウ.) presumably meaning "sea-inau" (inau is the shaved wood ritual decor, often compared to Shinto's gohei, and more generally called nusa (幣)).

An oft-reprinted folk narrative was one initially published by Iwao Yoshida (1914) under the double title of atui-na (Note: Japanese: アツウイナ.) or akkorokamui (at-koro-kamuy). This was reprinted by Genzō Sarashina (1971) as the tale of "Adoi-inau (wood-nusa of the sea)". (Note: Japanese: 「アドイ・イナウ（海の木幣）」.), whereas others have republished the tale as that of the akkorokamui.

== Legend ==
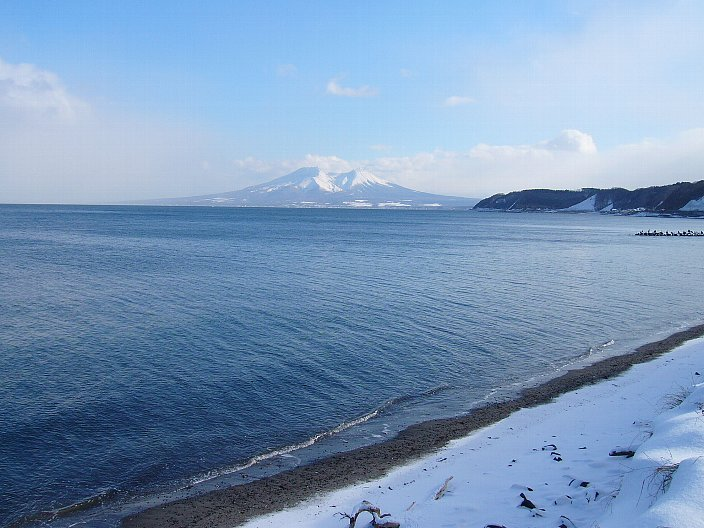
Uchiura Bay and Mount Komagatake near Yakumo town, Hokkaidō, looking southeast

According to the legend of the Iburi region, the akkoro kamuy (a.k.a. atuina) is a giant octopus and the nushi ("lord") of Funka Bay (officially called Uchiura Bay).

The folktale asserts that the monster attains the size of 1 chō equivalent to metric 1 ha (110,000 sq ft) according to legend. It was a feared monster, believed capable of swallowing a bezaisen type ship. (Note: Type widely used in maritime shipping in Japan up to the Meiji Period.) There is always the risk of the ship being capsized when sailing out to seas where the buri (amberjacks) and such gather, and as a precaution shipmates ready themselves with a great hook (gaff). The red body color is so intense the redness shines out to the skies, so its whereabouts can be detected from a far distance, and ships should be able to steer away and give it wide berth.

According to a variant description, a man named Itaknep (Note: Japanese: イタクネップ.) claimed to have seen one at "Cape Ecori" (i.e. Cape Ikori at Rebunge (aza-Rubunge, Toyoura, Abuta District). He estimated it to be of whale-swallowing size, 20 ken (36 metres (118 ft)). (Note: Yoshida uses traditional Japanese distance units, Sarshina converts to approx. 40 meters. Roughly computes to 1600 sq. meters or 0.16 hectares, which is 1/6 the area size of the above version.) The tides all around would bubble up and froth violently.

=== Spider origin ===
According to legend, Akkorokamui was once a gigantic spider named yauskep, ya-oske-p ("net-braiding-one") (Note: Transliterated into Japanese as yaushikepu ヤウシケプ.) (Note: Cf. Yaushukep for "spider" in Batchelor's dict.) that ravaged a village named Rebunge, destroying homes and laying waste to the land. A traveling elder from Shakotan found five surviving men in a cave and learned the circumstances. Together they sought assistance from the elder's son in Lake Tōya. They prayed to Samaykur kamuy and Okikurmi to shrink the spider down, but it was beyond the abilities of the magical spirit (nitne kamuy) (Note: Japanese: ニッネカムイ) who was ordered to carry out this task. Next the humans begged to the sea god Repun Kamuy, who agreed to take custody of the multi-legged monster and plunged it into Funka Bay, and the spider was transformed into the octopus. This then became the baneful akkoro kamuy.

=== Clothing origin ===
Another piece of etiological folklore gives a different origin for the octopus. It tells the story of Kotan-kar-kamuy injured by a bear, at a place called Akapira (possibly Akahira, Sorachi District). His wife rushed to nurse him back to health. The couple returned to the heavenly world, but since something worn in the earthly world cannot be carried up to heaven, the goddess disrobed and cast off her "under-belt" (pón-kut (Note: Japanese: ポンクッ.)) into the sea, which transformed into akkoro kamuy (at-kor-kamuy, "strings-possessing-god"), the octopus. This "under-belt", braided from eight cords of cloth, was a sort of chastity belt worn by gentlewomen (kátkemat). (Note: She also cast off her undershirt (mour to the sea which transformed into the atuy-kor-ekasi ("sea-possessing-elderly"), i.e., turtle (Ainu: echinke). When the goddess rushed to her husband, her spittle turned into the swan, a bird that cries wistfully in a voice like a woman.)

== Rātoshikamui ==
A giant octopus also occurs in Ainu lore under the name of Rātoshikamui (ラートシカムイ, Ainu romanization unverified, but meaning "many-tailed god" in Ainu). (Note: In Ainu, ra designates "below, beneath", and at "string" is the term used in other octopus names to indicate "tentacle", while usi indicates "multitude, swarm, overgrown", etc.)

According to the onomastic (toponymic) lore passed down in the Ishikari area, the Rātoshikamui, the octopus that was the mightiest of the sea and the huri kamui, the giant bird which was mightiest on land engaged in a match of strength.

The Rādoshikamui (ラードシカムイ, variant pronunciation) purported to be the strongest being of the sea, while the land champion, the huri bird measured 7 ri (27.5km), (Note: Although the modern Japanese ri is set at 3.929 kilometres (2.441 mi), in 1 ri of ancient times it measured only 1/6th of that, as may be what is meant in Ainu place name lore. The Chinese li also measured about the 537–645 metres (0.334–0.401 mi) range during the Qing dynasty when the Ainu actively traded such things as Chinese silk garments, referred to as ezo nishiki.) and they were at odds with each other over their boast. One time, the two titans met at the mouth of the Ishikari River. (Note: Note that Ishikari River flows in to the Sea of Japan (the west coast), and in Matsutani's retelling, the Rādoshikamui is purported to dwell in the Sea of Japan. Whereas Funka Bay where the akkorokamui dwells counts as a Pacific Ocean bay.) The octopus squirted ink, protruded its mouth, (Note: While octopodes have beaks, in Japanese caricatures (manga, etc.) of the octopus, its siphon (mollusc) which squirts ink and water is typically depicted as its mouth.) and its eyes were furious. The huri bird spread its wings assuming a guarding pose, and started pecking at the tentacles above surface, then tried to lift the octopus up out of its depths. But the octopus's head never emerged out into the air. In turn, the octopus twisted its tentacles around the bird and pulled. Their strengths were evenly matched, resulting in a stalemate. (Note: Miyoko Matsutani (1995). "Kyochō taiji" 巨鳥退治, "Eradication of the Giant Bird" is a composite retelling, and the premised that the bird was originally harmless to men until a certain girl angered it by defiling its drinking spot is taken from an entirely different narrative, passed down in the Tokachi area. Also, Matsutani's version has the huri bird make such noise as to awaken the octopus, but such a detail is absent from the original tale redacted from the informant.)

During the tug of war, the huri kamui strove not to be dragged into the sea by flapping its tail feathers (ishi or isi in Ainu ) left and right (such a movement is called kari), hence the sea in that area came to be called "Ishikari".

== Similar creatures ==
Another giant sea-beast of lore said to be found in Funka Bay is the giant sea cucumber named atuy kakura, (Note: Japanese: アツゥイカクラ, アヅイカクラ, アドイカクラ), literally "sea"+"sea cucumber", more particularly the [sub]-species commonly called fujiko, Cucumaria frondosa japonica. which folklore says transformed from a woman's mour (undergarment). The name specifically refers to the type of sea cucumber known as fujiko (or kinko), now classified as Cucumaria frondosa subspecies japonica. (Note: The term adoy kakura [sic] is glossed as "fujiko of the sea", scientific name Cucumaria japonica, but this is unaccepted taxon according to WoRMS and synonymized with C. frondosa japonica.) The monster uses its mouth to sucks onto driftwood, etc., to float to the sea surface, and is said to flip over fishing vessels that may approach.

The nushi of the seas around Muroran was said to be the「atuy kor ekas, (Note: Japanese: アツゥイコロエカシ.) a giant red monster capable of swallowing ships, but different from the atiyna (octopus), but possibly the same as the rebun ekashi, repun ekas (Note: Japanese: レブンエカシ.) (cf. infra) by another name. According to the injured god narrative discussed above (§ Clothing origin) when the god's wife cast down her mour (undergarment) into the sea, it turned into the atuy-kor-ekasi ("sea-possessing-old man"), i.e., a turtle (Ainu: echinke). (Note: The umi-nushi (海主) is written similarly to umibōzu (海坊主), and the encyclopedia Wakan Sansai Zue asserts that what is commonly called umibōzu in Japan corresponds to the human-faced turtle called heshang yu in China (pronounced oshō-uo in Japanese, and meaning "monk-fish").)

The repun ekas ("old man of the deep sea" or "of the offing") is another sea monster, said to devour 8 whales. Once, 2 fishermen were swallowed inside, and stoked a bonfire inside that caused the monster to belch them out, but they may have already been afflicted by the monster's venom for the full head of their hair fell out and they turned bald.。

== In Shinto ==
Ainu reverence of this monster has permeated into Shinto, which has incorporated Akkorokamui as a minor kami. Self purification practices for Akkorokamui are often strictly followed. While Akkorokamui is often presented as a benevolent kami with powers to heal and bestow knowledge, it is fickle and has the propensity to do harm. Akkorokamui's nature as an octopus means that it is persistent and it is near impossible to escape its grasp without permission. Shrines in dedication to Akkorokamui and associated octopus deities are found throughout Japan.

Akkorokamui enjoys the sea and offerings which reflect this: fish, crab, mollusks, and the like are particular favorites of Akkorokamui, which give back that which it gave. Homage to Akkorokamui is often for ailments of the limbs or skin, but mental purification and spiritual release is particularly important.

Akkorokamui is characteristically described with the ability to self-amputate, like several octopus species, and regenerate limbs. This characteristic manifests in the belief in Shinto that Akkorokamui has healing powers. Consequently, it is believed among followers that giving offerings to Akkorokamui will heal ailments of the body, in particular, disfigurements and broken limbs.

== In popular culture ==
- In the Bob's Burgers episode "Flu-ouise", some of Louise Belcher's toys are revealed to be named after Japanese legendary creatures, including an octopus called Akkoro Kamui. They come to life in a fever dream Louise goes through, with Akkoro Kamui sounding like her mother Linda. They also appear in The Bob's Burgers Movie.

== See also ==
- Kraken
- List of cryptids

== Bibliography ==
- Sarashina, Genzō [in Japanese] (1971). Ainu densetsushū アイヌ伝説集. Kita Shobo. ndljp:12572425.
