= Japan National Route 36 =

National highway in Japan

National Route 36
- 国道36号
- Route 36 in Sapporo, facing west

Route information
- Length: 133.0 km (82.6 mi)

Location
- Country: Japan

Highway system
- National highways of Japan; Expressways of Japan
← National Route 35	→ National Route 37

National Route 36 (国道36号, Kokudō sanjūroku-gō) is a national highway connecting Sapporo and Muroran in Hokkaidō, Japan. The highway is home to one of the most accident prone intersections in Hokkaidō.

== Route data ==
- Length: 133.0 km (82.7 mi)
- Origin: Chuo-ku, Sapporo, Sapporo (originates at the origins of Routes 12 and 230)
- Terminus: Muroran, Hokkaido
- Major cities: Chitose, Tomakomai, Noboribetsu

== History ==
- 1952-12-04 - First Class National Highway 36 (from Sapporo to Muroran)
- 1965-04-01 - General National Highway 36 (from Sapporo to Muroran)

== Municipalities passed through ==
- Ishikari Subprefecture
  - Sapporo - Kitahiroshima - Eniwa - Chitose
- Iburi Subprefecture
  - Tomakomai - Shiraoi - Noboribetsu - Muroran

== Intersects with ==
- Ishikari Subprefecture
  - Routes 12 and 230; at the origin, in Chuo-ku, Sapporo
  - Route 453; at Toyohira-ku, Sapporo
  - Route 337; at Chitose City
- Iburi subprefecture
  - Route 234; at Numanohata, Tomakomai City
  - Route 276; at Motonakano-cho, Tomakomai City
  - Route 37; at Muroran City
