= Toyoura Station =

Railway station in Toyoura, Hokkaido, Japan

Coordinates: 42.5794°N 140.7149°E

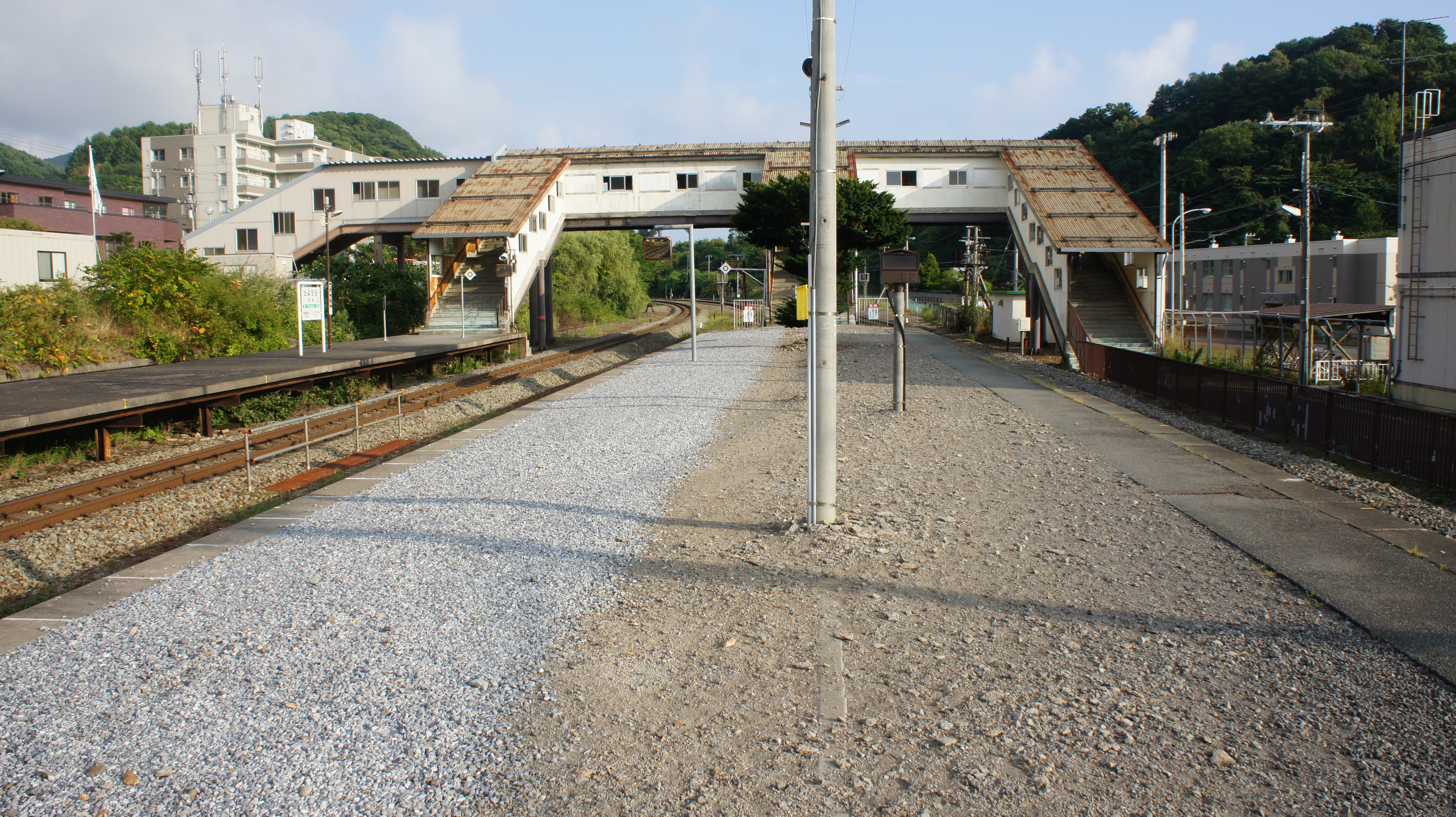
Toyoura Station on JR Hokkaido Muroran Main Line

Toyoura Station (豊浦駅, Toyoura-eki) is a train station in Toyoura, Abuta District, Hokkaidō, Japan.

== Lines ==
- Hokkaido Railway Company
  - Muroran Main Line Station H42

== Adjacent stations ==
«	Service	»
Muroran Main Line
Ōkishi	-	Tōya
