= Institute of Algological Research =

Research institute in Japan

Institute of Algological Research (Japanese: 北海道大学北方生物圏フィールド科学センター水圏ステーション室蘭)
- Type: Public
- Established: 1933
- President: Taizo Motomura
- Faculty: 3
- Undergraduates: 10
- Postgraduates: 3
- Doctoral students: 2
- Location: Muroran, Hokkaidō, Japan

Institute of Algological Research pier

Rocky Intertidal shore around Institute of Algological Research has variegated flora. Featured in this photograph are Ulvophysean green algae Monostroma surrounded by brown algae Laminaria

The Institute of Algological Research (sometimes referred to as Muroran Marine Station, or Northern Hemisphere Field Station) in Muroran is one of the oldest research institutes for phycology research in Japan. Institute of Algological Research is located in the town of Muroran, Hokkaidō, Japan and is involved in research leading to MS and PhD degrees in Phycology. Graduate students are often registered with Hokkaido University.

== History ==
The Institute of Algological Research was founded in 1933.

== Habitat ==
Coastal zone surrounding the institute has one of the largest seaweed biodiversity in Japan, with over 200 species of macroalgae. The intertidal rocky shore is covered with luxuriant growth of seaweeds belonging to such diverse genera as Ulvophyceae, Rhodophyceae and Phaeophyceae. The close proximity to this very diverse natural habitat makes Institute of Algological Research, one of the most prominent Phycological research institute in the world.

== Faculty ==
- Taizo Motomura, working on Spindle formation in Brown algal zygotes
- Yotsukura Norishige, working on Mitosis and Cytokinesis in Brown algae
- Chikako Nagasato, working on taxonomy and ecophysiology of Laminariales

== See also ==
- The Usa Marine Biological Institute is a similar research facility located in Usa cho, Japan.
- The Woods Hole Oceanographic Institution is also a similar oceanographic facility located at Woods Hole in Massachusetts.
- The Friday Harbor Laboratories in the United States also conducts similar research in Marine Biology.
