= Disappearance of Asami Chida =

Missing Student Case

Asami Chida
- 千田麻未
- Born: April 12, 1984 (Showa 59); Hokkaido, Japan
- Disappeared: March 6, 2001 (aged 16) (Heisei 13); Muroran, Iburi, Hokkaido, Japan
- Status: Missing for 25 years, 5 months and 1 day
- Education: Hokkaido Muroran Sakae High School
- Height: 153 cm (60 in)
- Distinguishing features: Straight black hair, pierced ears, small mole on right cheek, thin, blood type O, 23.5 cm shoe size
- Investigators: Muroran Police Station, Hokkaido Prefectural Police
- Website: Hokkaido Prefectural Police Request for Information

Locations

The Disappearance of Asami Chida occurred in Muroran, Iburi, Hokkaido, Japan on the afternoon of Tuesday, March 6, 2001 (Heisei 13). The unsolved missing persons investigation is named the Muroran High School Girl Disappearance Case (室蘭女子高生失踪事件).

Asami, a sixteen year-old Hokkaido Muroran Sakae High School student at the time from the Hakuchodai, was last seen on security camera footage at the Muroran Saty (presently Aeon Muroran Store) in the Higashimachi locality of Muroran. She was seen talking to a friend in the store. Her school was closed that Tuesday because of entrance exams. After visiting the store, she presumably boarded a Chuocho-Kodai Loop Line (Outer Loop) bus for her part-time job at a bakery, got off near the business in the Chiribetsucho District, and vanished. She was asked to go to the bakery for coffee making training. The last record of her phone being used was before 2 p.m. She reportedly told a friend or boyfriend over the phone, "I can't talk right now, I'll call you back later.” She was wearing green leather shoes, blue jeans and a beige blazer and Burberry scarf that day.

The police have received hundreds of tips over the years, and several theories have been suggested regarding her disappearance, but no incontrovertible evidence has been found. A person of interest or suspect in the case was the owner of the bakery that Asami was scheduled to have training with the afternoon she went missing. He presented an alibi, and stated he was with his mother at the time of the disappearance. The owner was kept under police surveillance, questioned, and his house and car were searched. After the owner's house was demolished years later, the police searched the foundations of the house using heavy machinery, but nothing related to the case was discovered. The bakery eventually closed down because of financial reasons.

The Muroran Police Station and Hokkaido Prefectural Police are still seeking information regarding Asami's whereabouts. More than 40,000 investigators have been assigned to the case. Missing posters with her photo have been displayed in Muroran for decades. The National Research Institute of Police Science created an image of her possible appearance in her 30s. Her high school stated she is on leave and can return any time to complete her studies.

== Media ==
- "Disappearance Mystery ~ From Muroran". SOS. 1 March 2003. TV Asahi.

== See also ==
- List of people who disappeared mysteriously (2000–present)
