= UMBI =

UMBI or Umbi may refer to:

- Usa Marine Biological Institute, Japan
- University of Maryland Biotechnology Institute, U.S.
- UKM Medical Molecular Biology Institute, National University of Malaysia
- Mount Umbi, Kurmuk (woreda), Ethiopia
- "Umbi", track on 2001 album Kristnihald undir Jökli by Quarashi
- Umbi Films, production company of Gurinder Chadha
