= Muroran Institute of Technology =

- 室蘭工業大学
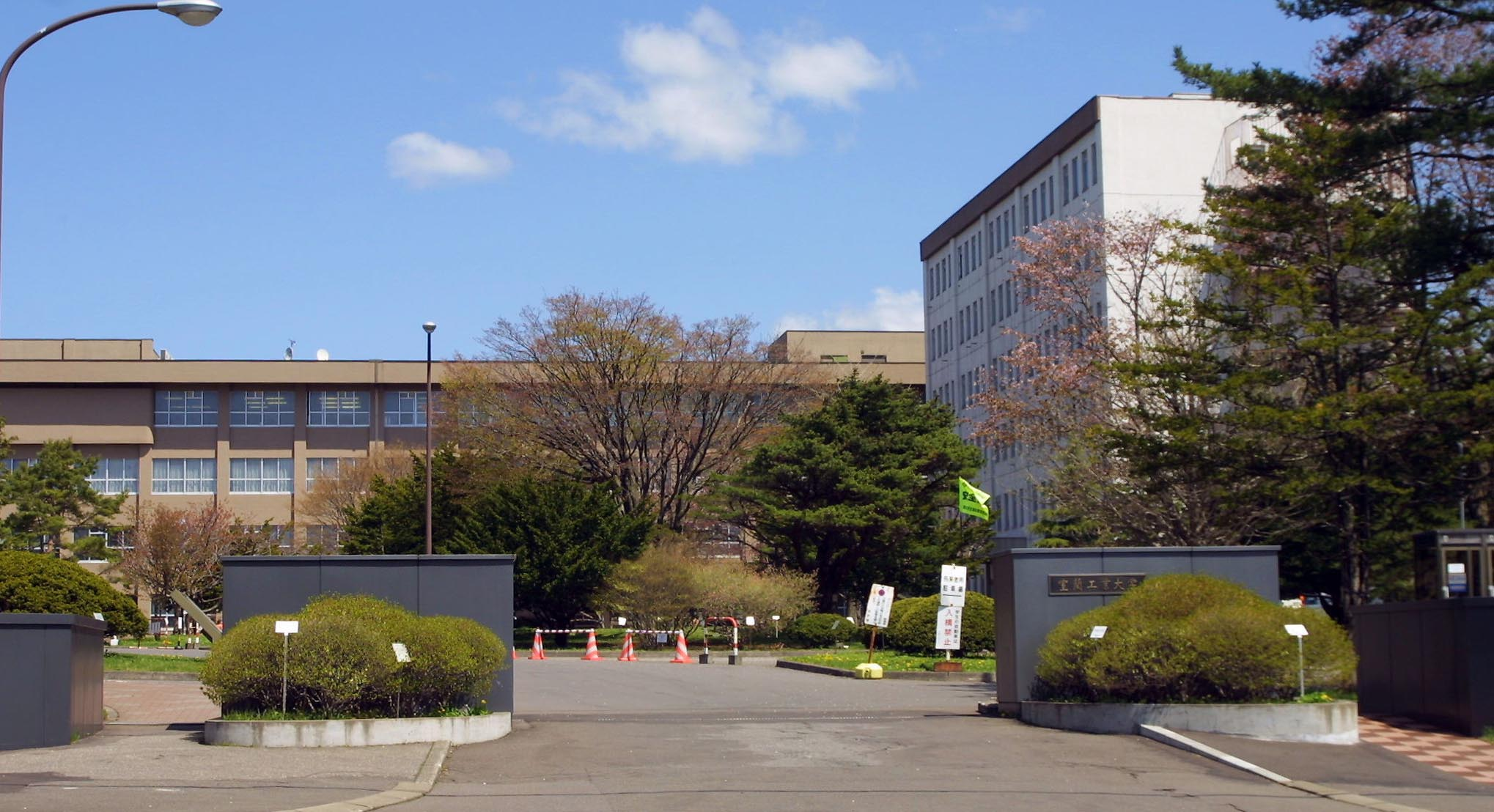
- Type: Public (National)
- Established: Founded 1876
- President: Yoshikazu Kuga
- Undergraduates: 2837（2018）
- Postgraduates: 544（2018）
- Location: Muroran, Hokkaido, Japan; 42°22′37″N 141°02′03″E
- Website: muroran-it.ac.jp/en

- Location in Hokkaido Prefecture Location in Japan

Muroran Institute of Technology (室蘭工業大学, Muroran Kōgyō Daigaku), abbreviated as MuroranIT, MuIT, or Muroran Tech is a national university in Muroran, Hokkaido, Japan.

== History ==
- 1897 Sapporo Agricultural College Department of Civil Engineering Established
- 1918 Sapporo Agricultural College promoted to Hokkaido Imperial University.
- 1939 Muroran National Industrial College Established
- 1944 Muroran National Industrial College promoted to Muroran National College of Technology.
- 1949 Muroran National College of Technology and Hokkaido Imperial University Department of Civil Engineering merged and Muroran Institute of Technology were founded.

== Academics ==
Muroran Institute of Technology is a technical institute which is composed of

- the Faculty of Engineering, a four-year course leading to a bachelor's degree, which consists of six departments
- a Graduate School, which has a two-year course in six divisions for the master's degree
- a three-year course in four divisions for a Doctoral degree.

== Campus ==
The university has a campus covering an area of 197,485 m^{2} in the city of Muroran, which is at the entrance of Uchiura Bay in the southwestern part of Hokkaido.

== Departments ==
- Department of Civil Engineering and Architecture
- Department of Mechanical, Aerospace, and Materials Engineering
- Department of Applied Sciences
- Department of Information and Electronic Engineering
