= Chitose, Hokkaido =

Chitose 千歳市
- City
- Chitose City
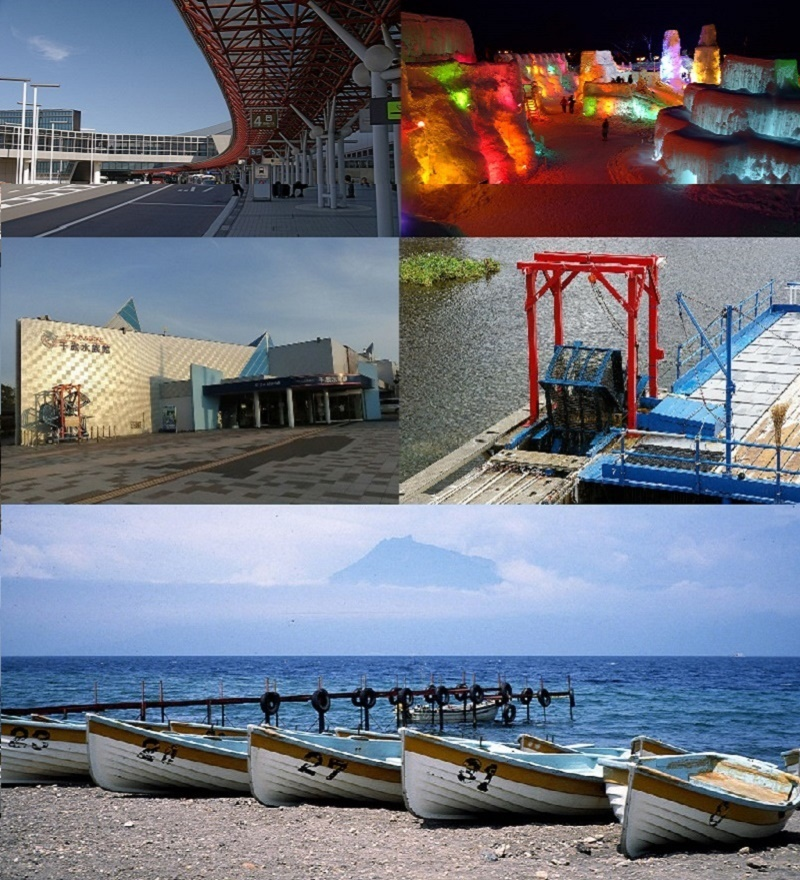

- Flag Seal

- Location of Chitose in Hokkaido

- Location within Japan Location within Asia Location within Earth
- Coordinates: 42°49′N 141°39′E
- Country: Japan
- Region: Hokkaido
- Prefecture: Hokkaido
- Subprefecture: Ishikari Subprefecture

Government
  - Mayor: Ryūichi Yokota

Area
  - Total: 594.50 km^{2} (229.54 sq mi)

Population (February 1, 2024)
  - Total: 97,919
  - Density: 164.71/km^{2} (426.59/sq mi)
- Time zone: UTC+9 (Japan Standard Time)
- Climate: Dfb
- Website: www.city.chitose.lg.jp
- Symbols
- Flower: Azalea and hanashōbu (Iris ensata var. ensata)
- Tree: Japanese white birch and katsura (Cercidiphyllum japonicum)

Chitose (千歳市, Chitose-shi) is a city located in Ishikari Subprefecture, Hokkaido, Japan, and home to New Chitose Airport, the biggest international airport in Hokkaido and closest airport to Sapporo, as well as the neighboring Chitose Air Base. As of February 1, 2024, the city had an estimated population of 97,919, with 52,196 households, and a population density of 165 persons per km^{2}. The total area is 594.50 km^{2}. The city was founded on July 1, 1958. The city is notable for having a Peace Pagoda, built by the Japanese Buddhist order Nipponzan Myohoji in 1978.

== History ==
- 1880: The village of Chitose (consisting of a merger of the localities of Chitose, Osatsu, Usakumai, Rankoshi, Izari, Shimamatsu) is established.
- 1897: The village of Eniwa (consisting of the localities of Izari and Shimamatsu) (now a city) splits off.
- 1915: Chitose (consisting of the localities of Chitose, Osatsu, Usakumai, Rankoshi) becomes a Second Class Municipality.
- 1939: Chitose becomes a First Class Municipality.
- 1942: Chitose promoted to town status.
- Post WWII - Chitose hosts a US Air Force base.
- July 1, 1958: Chitose promotes to city status.

== Geography ==
Chitose is one of the gateways to Shikotsu-Tōya National Park, Lake Shikotsu and Mount Tarumae. The city is bounded by Eniwa in the north and by Tomakomai in the south.

=== Etymology ===
In the Ainu language, Chitose was originally called shikot, meaning big depression or hollow, like Lake Shikotsu which is a caldera lake. In Japanese, this sounded too much like dead bones (死骨, shikotsu), so it was changed to Chitose.

== Climate ==
Chitose experiences a humid continental climate with cold winters and warm summers. The hottest and coldest temperatures, respectively, ever recorded are 34.2 °C (93.6 °F) and −30.7 °C (−23.3 °F).

Climate data for Chitose (elevation 22 m, 2003–2020 normals, extremes 2003–present)
Month	Jan	Feb	Mar	Apr	May	Jun	Jul	Aug	Sep	Oct	Nov	Dec	Year
Record high °C (°F)	8.4 (47.1)	10.1 (50.2)	16.2 (61.2)	23.9 (75.0)	28.6 (83.5)	31.4 (88.5)	34.1 (93.4)	34.2 (93.6)	30.5 (86.9)	25.8 (78.4)	20.4 (68.7)	14.7 (58.5)	34.2 (93.6)
Mean daily maximum °C (°F)	−1.1 (30.0)	−0.3 (31.5)	4.1 (39.4)	11.0 (51.8)	16.6 (61.9)	20.0 (68.0)	23.0 (73.4)	25.1 (77.2)	22.5 (72.5)	16.1 (61.0)	8.9 (48.0)	1.7 (35.1)	12.3 (54.1)
Daily mean °C (°F)	−6.1 (21.0)	−5.3 (22.5)	−0.3 (31.5)	5.5 (41.9)	11.1 (52.0)	15.1 (59.2)	18.8 (65.8)	20.9 (69.6)	17.4 (63.3)	10.4 (50.7)	3.9 (39.0)	−3.0 (26.6)	7.4 (45.3)
Mean daily minimum °C (°F)	−12.9 (8.8)	−12.5 (9.5)	−5.8 (21.6)	0.0 (32.0)	6.0 (42.8)	11.4 (52.5)	15.7 (60.3)	17.5 (63.5)	12.5 (54.5)	4.3 (39.7)	−1.7 (28.9)	−8.9 (16.0)	2.1 (35.8)
Record low °C (°F)	−25.4 (−13.7)	−25.4 (−13.7)	−22.2 (−8.0)	−8.4 (16.9)	−2.7 (27.1)	2.7 (36.9)	8.0 (46.4)	9.1 (48.4)	1.1 (34.0)	−4.6 (23.7)	−14.4 (6.1)	−22.7 (−8.9)	−25.4 (−13.7)
Average precipitation mm (inches)	25.6 (1.01)	30.1 (1.19)	45.8 (1.80)	66.8 (2.63)	89.0 (3.50)	95.7 (3.77)	113.2 (4.46)	155.2 (6.11)	140.5 (5.53)	93.4 (3.68)	80.3 (3.16)	49.0 (1.93)	984.7 (38.77)
Average snowfall cm (inches)	63 (25)	64 (25)	42 (17)	3 (1.2)	0 (0)	0 (0)	0 (0)	0 (0)	0 (0)	0 (0)	10 (3.9)	44 (17)	227 (89)
Average precipitation days (≥ 1.0 mm)	7.3	8.0	9.1	9.1	9.7	8.5	9.8	11.0	9.8	9.7	10.4	7.8	110.2
Source: Japan Meteorological Agency (2003–2020 normals; snowfall 2006–2020; extremes 2003–present)

Climate data for Lake Shikotsu, Chitose (elevation 290 m, 1991–2020 normals, extremes 1977–present)
Month	Jan	Feb	Mar	Apr	May	Jun	Jul	Aug	Sep	Oct	Nov	Dec	Year
Record high °C (°F)	7.3 (45.1)	12.2 (54.0)	14.5 (58.1)	23.8 (74.8)	29.7 (85.5)	30.0 (86.0)	32.0 (89.6)	31.9 (89.4)	29.1 (84.4)	24.4 (75.9)	19.3 (66.7)	12.5 (54.5)	32.0 (89.6)
Mean daily maximum °C (°F)	−1.9 (28.6)	−1.2 (29.8)	2.4 (36.3)	8.7 (47.7)	15.2 (59.4)	18.7 (65.7)	22.0 (71.6)	23.2 (73.8)	20.0 (68.0)	14.2 (57.6)	7.0 (44.6)	0.4 (32.7)	10.7 (51.3)
Daily mean °C (°F)	−4.8 (23.4)	−4.5 (23.9)	−1.0 (30.2)	4.4 (39.9)	9.9 (49.8)	14.0 (57.2)	18.0 (64.4)	19.4 (66.9)	16.1 (61.0)	10.2 (50.4)	3.5 (38.3)	−2.5 (27.5)	6.9 (44.4)
Mean daily minimum °C (°F)	−7.9 (17.8)	−7.9 (17.8)	−4.4 (24.1)	0.6 (33.1)	5.6 (42.1)	10.4 (50.7)	15.1 (59.2)	16.6 (61.9)	12.9 (55.2)	6.6 (43.9)	0.2 (32.4)	−5.4 (22.3)	3.5 (38.3)
Record low °C (°F)	−15.9 (3.4)	−18.2 (−0.8)	−15.8 (3.6)	−6.9 (19.6)	−1.7 (28.9)	2.1 (35.8)	7.7 (45.9)	8.7 (47.7)	3.8 (38.8)	−2.6 (27.3)	−10.5 (13.1)	−15.4 (4.3)	−18.2 (−0.8)
Average precipitation mm (inches)	89.4 (3.52)	72.2 (2.84)	93.8 (3.69)	103.0 (4.06)	143.9 (5.67)	138.0 (5.43)	163.8 (6.45)	216.9 (8.54)	262.0 (10.31)	193.8 (7.63)	137.4 (5.41)	97.3 (3.83)	1,711.3 (67.37)
Average precipitation days (≥ 1.0 mm)	10.4	10.4	12.2	10.4	10.7	9.7	10.8	12.3	13.4	12.2	12.0	10.5	135.1
Mean monthly sunshine hours	117.9	116.6	148.5	179.3	185.3	149.0	123.3	132.0	148.6	152.3	112.1	103.6	1,668.6
Source: Japan Meteorological Agency (1991–2020 normals, extremes 1977–present)

== Demographics ==
Per Japanese census data, the population of Chitose has grown steadily over the past half-century.

Historical population
Year	Pop.	±%
1970	56,118	—
1980	66,788	+19.0%
1990	78,946	+18.2%
2000	88,897	+12.6%
2010	93,604	+5.3%
2020	97,950	+4.6%

== Economy ==
China Airlines operates its Sapporo office on the third floor of the airport building.

The airline Hokkaido Air System was at one time headquartered at the New Chitose Airport in Chitose. Now its head office is on the property of Okadama Airport in Higashi-ku, Sapporo.

== Transport ==
=== Air ===
- New Chitose Airport

=== Rail ===
Muroran Main Line runs through the east of the city but there is no station.

- Chitose Line : Minami-Chitose - Chitose - Osatsu
- Chitose Line (branch line) : Minami-Chitose - New Chitose Airport
- Sekishō Line : Minami-Chitose

=== Road ===
Chitose is accessed by two expressways with an interchange in the west and another in the north on a separate expressway and the Chitose-Eniwa Junction connecting with the Eastern Hokkaido Expressway in the northwest. Chitose is also linked by National Route 36, National Route 274, National Route 276, National Route 337, and National Route 453.

== Education ==
Chitose has a university, two high schools, 18 junior high schools, and 10 elementary schools.

=== Universities ===
- Chitose Institute of Science and Technology
- Hokkaido Chitose College of Rehabilitation

=== High schools ===
- Hokkaido Chitose High School
- Hokkaido Chitose Hokuyou High School

== Mascots ==
Tamaran and Tamarin, the city's mascots

Chitose's mascots are Tamaran (たまらん) and Tamarin (たまりん). They are a fusion of eggs and airplanes to represent the city's dependence on eggs.

== Sister cities ==
Chitose has sister city relationships with:

- Anchorage, Alaska, United States (since 1968)
- Changchun, Jilin, China (since 2004)
- Ibusuki, Kagoshima, Japan (since 1994)
- Kongsberg, Norway (since 1988)

== Notable people ==
- Chiyotaikai Ryūji, sumo wrestler
- Aina Suzuki, voice actress
