= Rebun Station =

Railway station in Toyoura, Hokkaido, Japan

Coordinates: 42.5803°N 140.5953°E

H44 Rebun Station 礼文駅
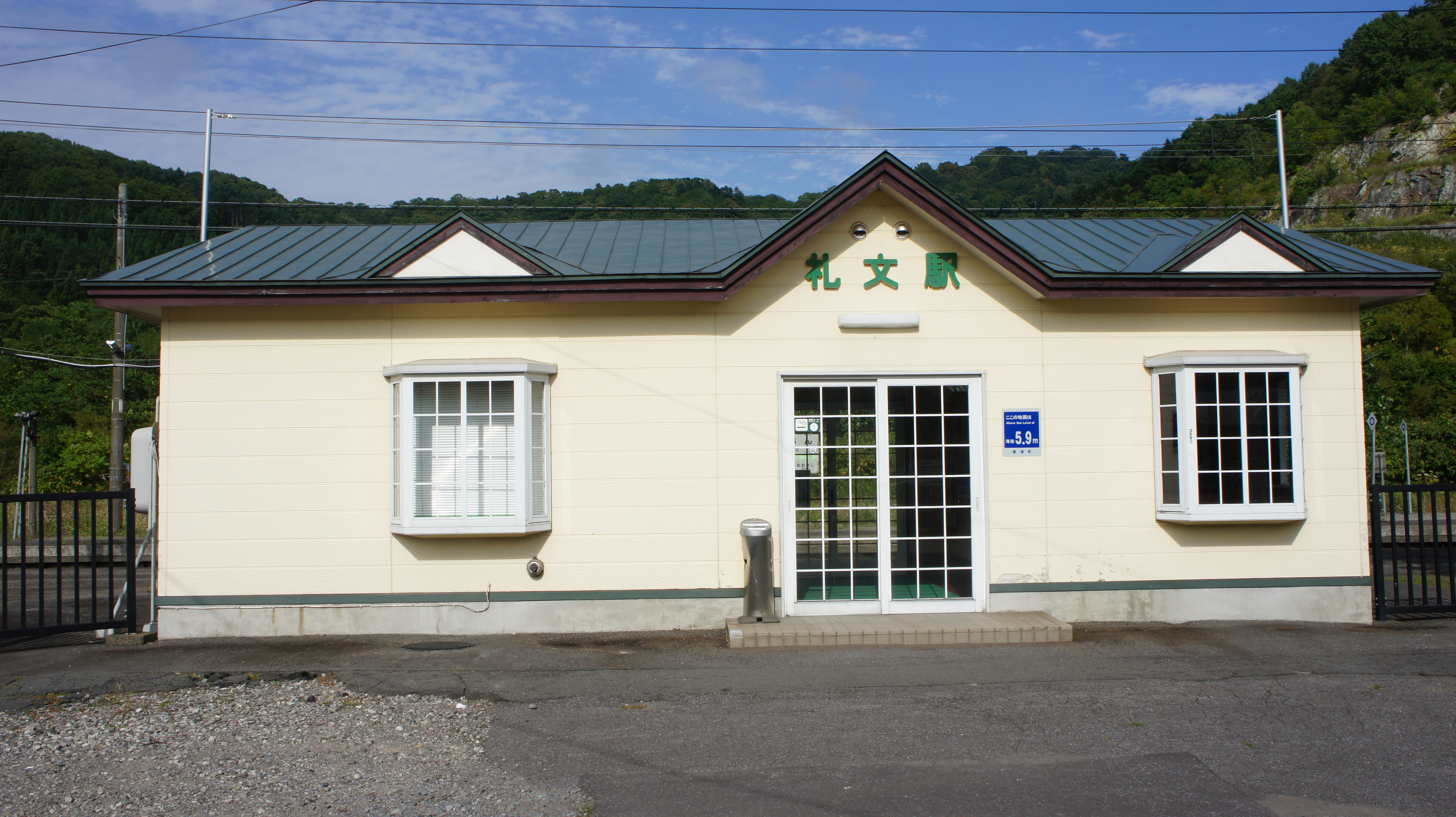
- JR Muroran-Main-Line, Rebun Station building

General information
- Operator: JR Hokkaido
- Line: Muroran Main Line

Construction
- Structure type: At grade

Other information
- Station code: H44

History
- Opened: 10 September 1928; 98 years ago

Passengers
- 2014: 4 daily

Services
Preceding station	JR Hokkaido	Following station
Koboro H45 towards Oshamambe	Muroran Main Line	Ōkishi H43 towards Iwamizawa
Location
- Location within Hokkaido Location within Japan

Rebun Station (礼文駅, Rebun-eki) is a railway station in Toyoura, Abuta District, Hokkaidō, Japan.

== Lines ==
- Hokkaido Railway Company
  - Muroran Main Line Station H44

== History ==
=== Future plans ===
In June 2023, this station was selected to be among 42 stations on the JR Hokkaido network to be slated for abolition owing to low ridership.
