= Japan National Route 453 =

Road in Hokkaido, Japan

National Route 453
- 国道453号

Route information
- Length: 123.5 km (76.7 mi)

Major junctions
- North end: National Route 36 in Toyohira-ku, Sapporo
- South end: National Route 37 in Date, Hokkaidō

Location
- Country: Japan
- Major cities: Eniwa; Chitose; Tomakomai

Highway system
- National highways of Japan; Expressways of Japan
← National Route 452	→ National Route 454

National Route 453 is a national highway of Japan connecting Toyohira-ku, Sapporo and Date, Hokkaido in Japan.

== History ==
- 1 April 1993 - General National Highway 453 (from Sapporo to Date)

== Overlapping sections ==
- From Chitose to Date : Route 276

== Municipalities passed through ==
- Ishikari Subprefecture
  - Sapporo - Eniwa - Chitose
- Iburi Subprefecture
  - Tomakomai - Date (Ōtaki) - Sobetsu - Date
