= Uchiura Bay =

Bay in Hokkaido, Japan

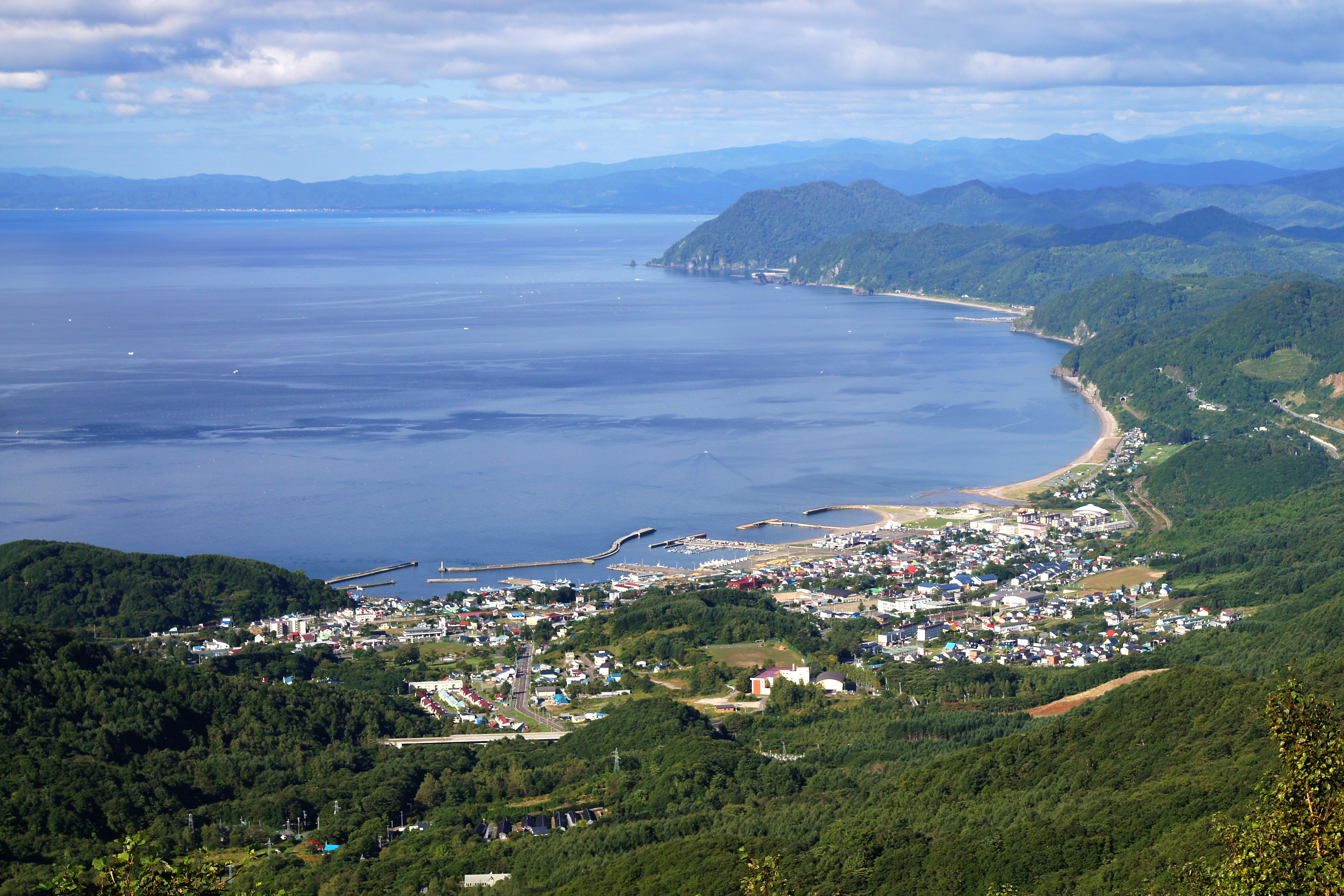
- View of Uchiura Bay and Toyoura from Mount Poromoi

- Location within Hokkaido Location within Japan
- Location: Hokkaido, Japan
- Coordinates: 42°20′N 140°35′E
- Ocean/sea sources: Pacific Ocean
- Basin countries: Japan
- Surface area: 2,485 square kilometers (959 mi^{2})
- Average depth: 93 meters (305 ft) (average maximum depth)

Uchiura Bay (Japanese: 内浦湾, Hepburn: Uchiura-wan), also known as Funka Bay (噴火湾, Funka-wan; Eruption Bay) or Iburi Bay (胆振湾, Iburi-wan), is a bay in southwestern Hokkaido, the northernmost main island of Japan. The mouth of the bay faces towards the southeast and is surrounded in part by the Oshima Peninsula.

== History ==
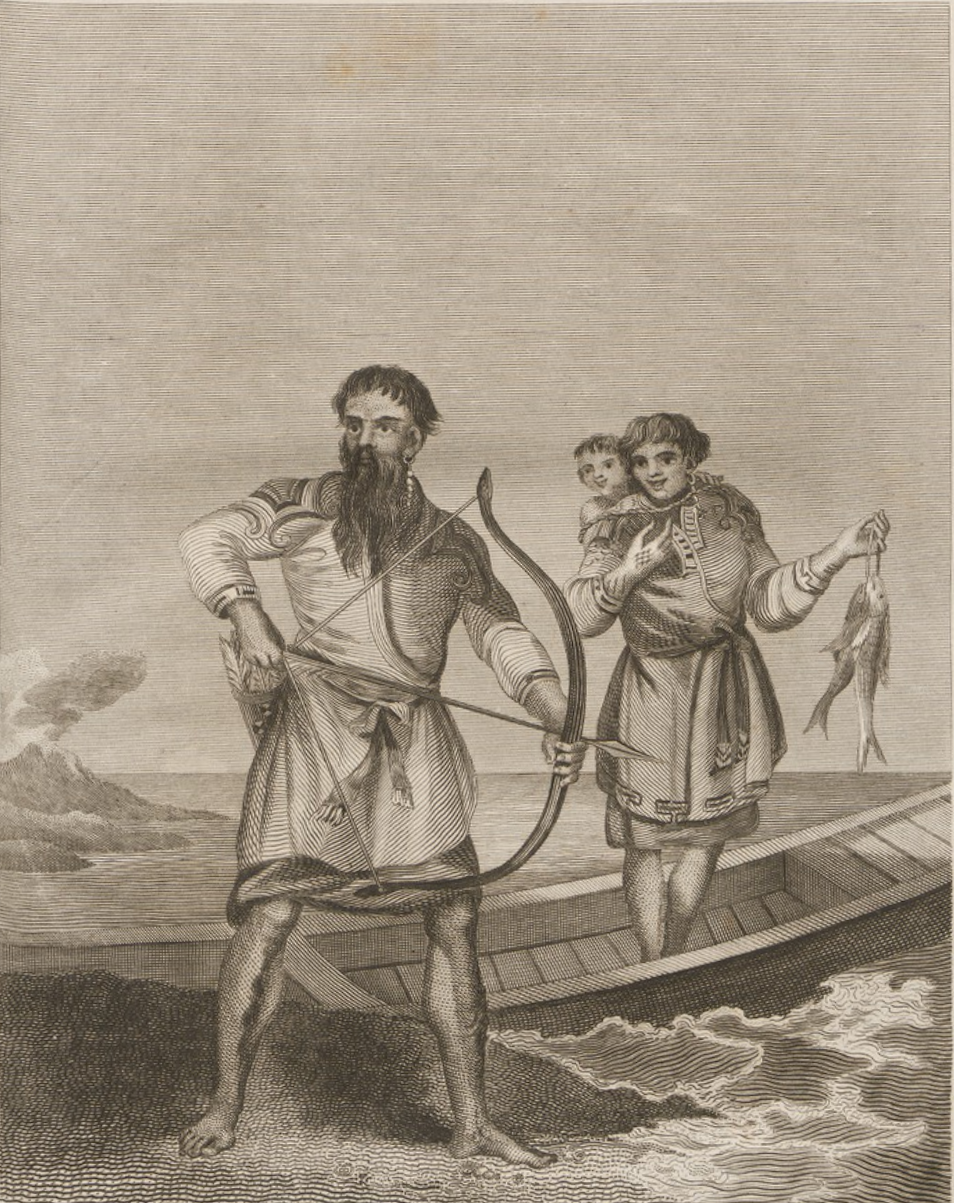
A sketch of an Ainu family living near Uchiura Bay during the voyage of Commander Broughton and HMS Providence.

The shoreline of Uchiura Bay was first settled by the Jōmon people as early as 4000 BC. Trade settlements have been found along its shoreline, such as the Ōfune Site where the Jōmon people relied on the body of water for trade routes to other Jōmon settlements in northern Tōhoku. In modern history, the bay was charted during the late-eighteenth century voyage of Royal Navy Commander William Robert Broughton and the crew of HMS Providence during the eruption of nearby Mount Usu. Due to the eruptive activity, they labeled the bay as "Volcano Bay" in September 1796. Commander Broughton and his crew mingled extensively with the Ainu and Japanese living around the bay while they surveyed the bay's coastline. At a dinner they exchanged maps with the Japanese and conversed using Russian.

== Geography ==
Uchiura Bay is a bay east of the Oshima Peninsula that protrudes from the southwestern corner of Hokkaido south towards Honshu and to the south of western Iburi Subprefecture. It is a subdivision of the Pacific Ocean with a total area of 2,485 square kilometers (959 mi^{2}). Its opening to the Pacific Ocean is marked by a 30.2-square-kilometer-long (11.7 mi^{2}) line between Hokkaido Koma-ga-take and Cape Chikiu. It has been known as "Eruption Bay" as well as "Volcano Bay" due to the eruption of Mount Usu when the bay was being documented by Western explorers in the late-eighteenth century. In addition to Mount Usu, several other volcanoes line the shore of Uchiura Bay. It has also been called Iburi Bay, likely due to its proximity to Iburi Subprefecture.

== Animal and plant life ==
The bay marks a junction between the arctic sea life seen in the waters surrounding northern Hokkaido and eastern Russia and the more temperate marine ecosystem seen around the rest of Japan. Arctic rainbow smelt, the Japanese lamprey, flounder, several species of shellfish, and kelp live in the waters of Uchiura Bay. The practice of farming scallops was first developed in the bay by the residents of the town of Toyoura on the bay's northern shore.

In Ainu mythology it is believed that a gigantic octopus kamuy lives in Uchiura Bay. The kraken-like creature is known as Atkorkamuy and Akkorokamui among the Ainu and Japanese, respectively.
