= Hokkaido Muroran Sakae High School =

School in Hokkaido, Japan

Coordinates: 42.3440°N 141.0313°E

- Japanese: 北海道室蘭栄高等学校
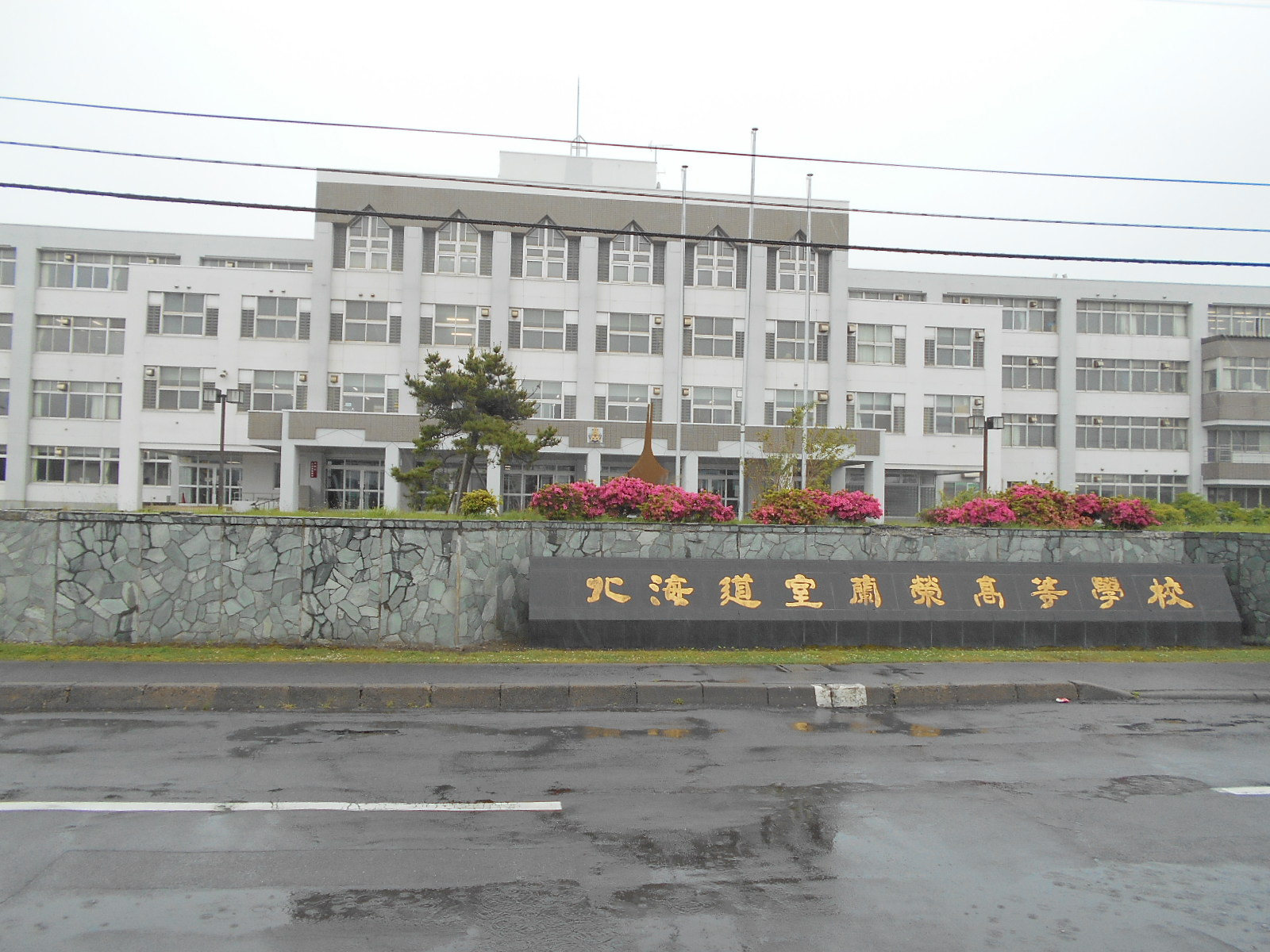

Information
- Established: 1917; 109 years ago

Hokkaido Muroran Sakae High School (Japanese: 北海道室蘭栄高等学校, romanized: Hokkaidō Muroran Sakae Kōtō Gakkō) is a high school in Muroran, Hokkaidō, Japan, founded in 1917. Hokkaido Muroran Sakae High School is one of the high schools administered by Hokkaido.

The school is operated by the Hokkaido Prefectural Board of Education.

== Notable alumni ==
- Yoshinori Yagi (八木 義徳) Japanese writer who received the 1944 Akutagawa Prize(芥川龍之介賞) and the 1976 Yomiuri Prize(読売文学賞).
- Ken Yasuda (安田 顕) Japanese actor, TV personality and seiyu, TEAM NACS member.

== Address and access ==
- Address: Higashimachi 3-29-5, Muroran, Hokkaido, Japan
- Access: a 15 minutes' walk from Higashi-Muroran Station of the Hokkaido Railway Company
