= Cape Chikiu =

Cape in Muroran, Hokkaido, Japan

Cape Chikiu チキウ岬
- Cape
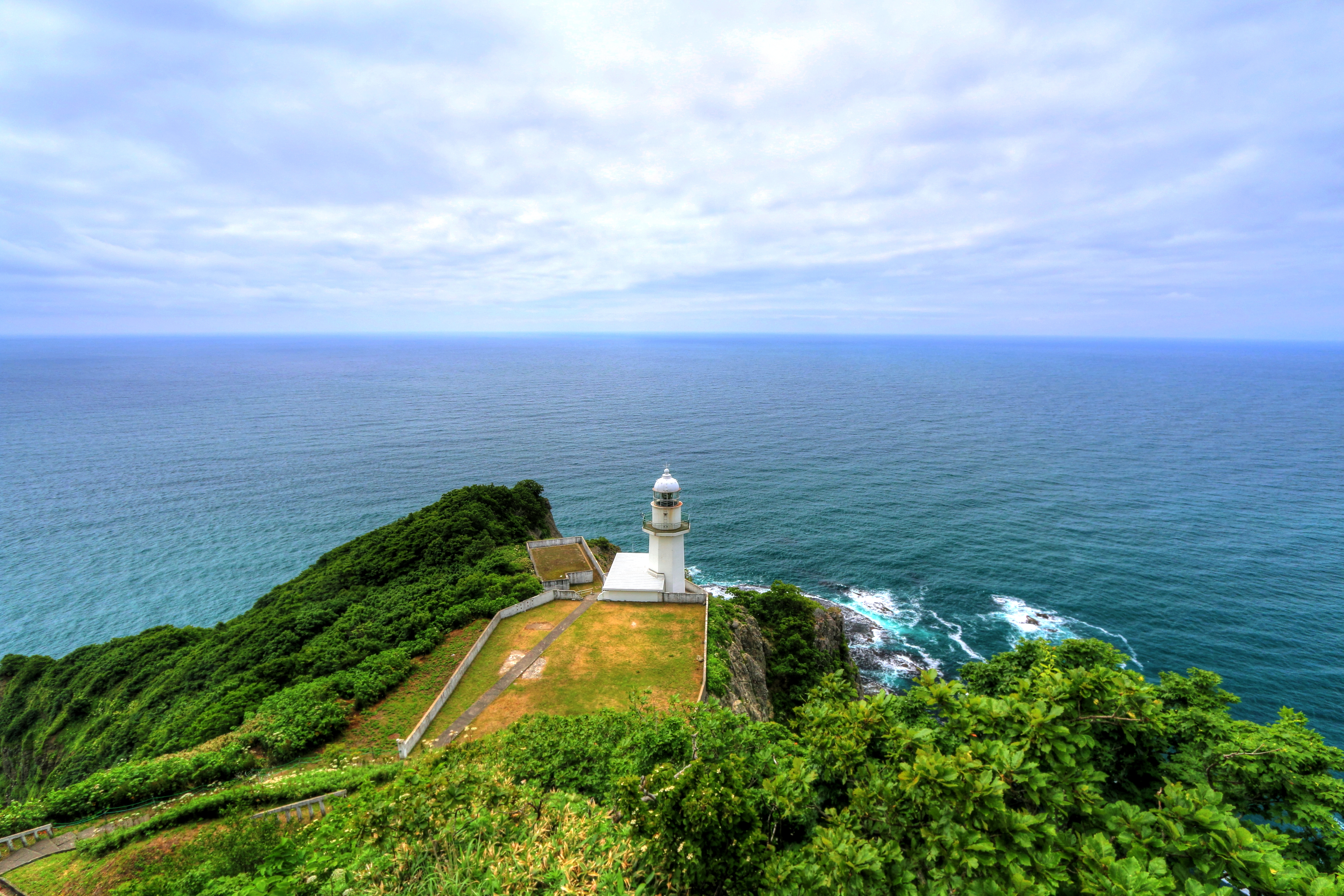
- Cape Chikiu Lighthouse

- Location of Cape Chikiu in Hokkaido Cape Chikiu (Japan)
- Coordinates: 42°18′06″N 141°00′07″E
- Location: Muroran, Japan

Cape Chikiu (チキウ岬, Chikiumisaki) is a cape facing the Pacific Ocean in Muroran City, Hokkaido, Japan. It is derived from "ci-ke-p" in Ainu language, which means "cliff" is accented and commonly referred to as Cape Chikiyu (地球岬, Chikiyumisaki), meaning "Earth cape" in Japanese.

== Overview ==
The Pacific side of the Etomo Peninsula is a scenic spot with cliffs rising 100 meters (330 ft) above sea level extending for about 14 kilometers (8.7 mi). Many people come to the cape to see the first sunrise on the new year to see the curvature of the horizon.

Cape Chikiu was placed first in the "100 best natural spots of Hokkaido" list published by the Asahi Shimbun in 1985. It was also included in the list of "Favorite Hokkaido scenic spots" by the Hokkaido Post Office in 1986 and the "100 new Japan sightseeing spots" by the Yomiuri Shimbun in 1987. Cape Chikiu named "The Etomo peninsula outer Coast" with "Harkaramoi, Masuich beach, Tokkarisho" and designated as a national scenic spot "Pirikanoka" (it means "Beautiful shape" in Ainu people Language) in 2012.

Chikiu Lighthouse was first turned on in 1920, and was selected as one of the "50 lighthouses of Japan". It was also dubbed by the Japan Society of Civil Engineers as part of the country's "civil engineering heritage".

== Fauna and flora ==
West from Cape Chikiu is green area of about fifty hectares based on urban planning. Along the walking path there are flowers such as Japanese fawn lilies, the Ezokawara nadeshiko, and the Ōbaki violet in the spring. The surrounding area is on a migratory birds route and is also known as Peregrine falcon nesting site for aim migratory birds. In addition, woodpeckers and other wild birds can be observed. The waterway which is located almost in the center of the green space is a valuable place for breeding of Hokkaido salamanders.

== Facilities ==
- Observatory
- Restrooms
- Stands
- Parking lot

== Access ==
From Bokoi Station on the JR Hokkaido Muroran Main Line take the Donan Bus bound for Cape Chikiu housing complex and get off there. At a distance of 1.1 kilometers (0.68 mi) away, it takes about 44 minutes on foot to reach Cape Chikiu Observatory from there.
