= Hakuchō Bridge =

Hakuchō Bridge Hakuchō Ō-hashi (白鳥大橋)
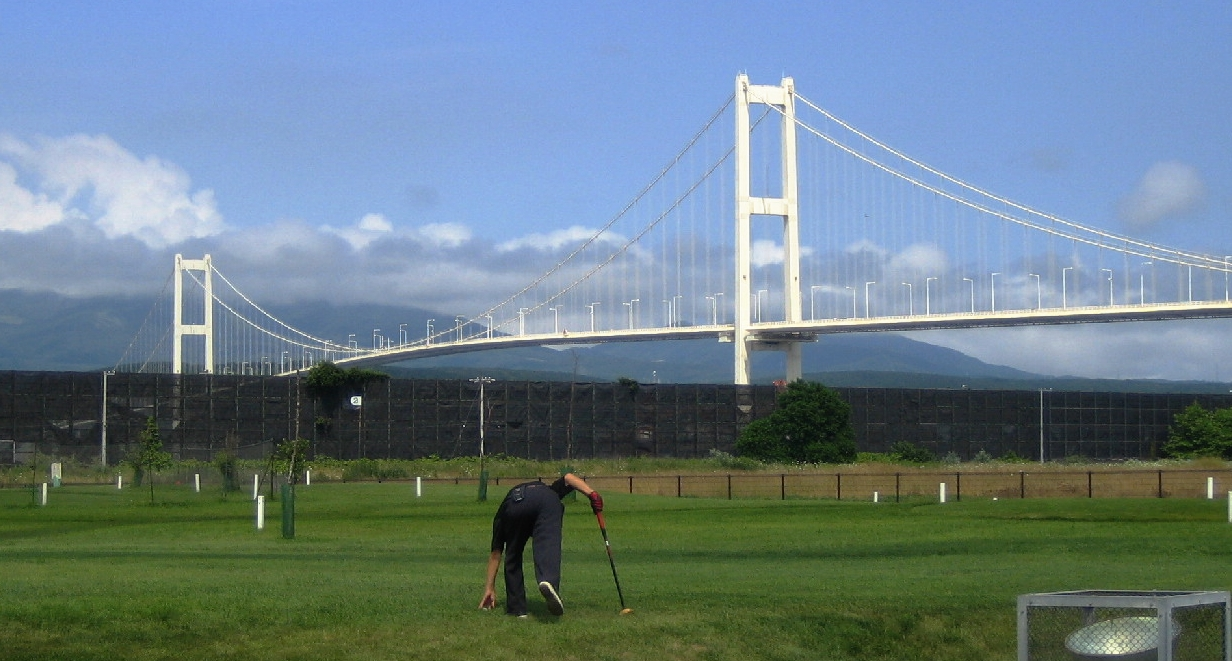
- Hakuchō Bridge at Shukuzu, Muroran
- Coordinates: 42°21′10″N 140°57′07″E
- Carries: two lanes of roadway
- Crosses: Muroran bay
- Locale: Jin-ya, Muroran and Shukuzu, Muroran

Characteristics
- Design: Suspension bridge
- Total length: 720 meters (2,360 ft)
- Height: 140 meters (460 ft) (pylons)
- Longest span: 1,380 meters (4,530 ft)
- Clearance below: 54.45 meters (178.6 ft)

History
- Construction start: 1985
- Construction end: 1998
- Opened: 13 June 1998

Statistics
- Toll: None

Location
- Interactive map of Hakuchō Bridge

The Hakuchō Bridge (白鳥大橋, Hakuchō Ō-hashi) is a suspension bridge in Muroran, Hokkaido, Japan. Opened on 17 April 1998, it has a main span of 720 meters (2,360 ft). It is the first section of the Hakuchō Shindō that is signed as an alternate route of Japan National Route 37.

Several windmills line the bridge which provide lighting at night to the park golf link nearby. The winds are extremely high on the bridge, so pedestrians, bikes, and motorbikes are prohibited from crossing.

== See also ==
- List of longest suspension bridge spans
