= Ōkishi Station =

Railway station in Toyoura, Hokkaido, Japan

Coordinates: 42.5860°N 140.6389°E

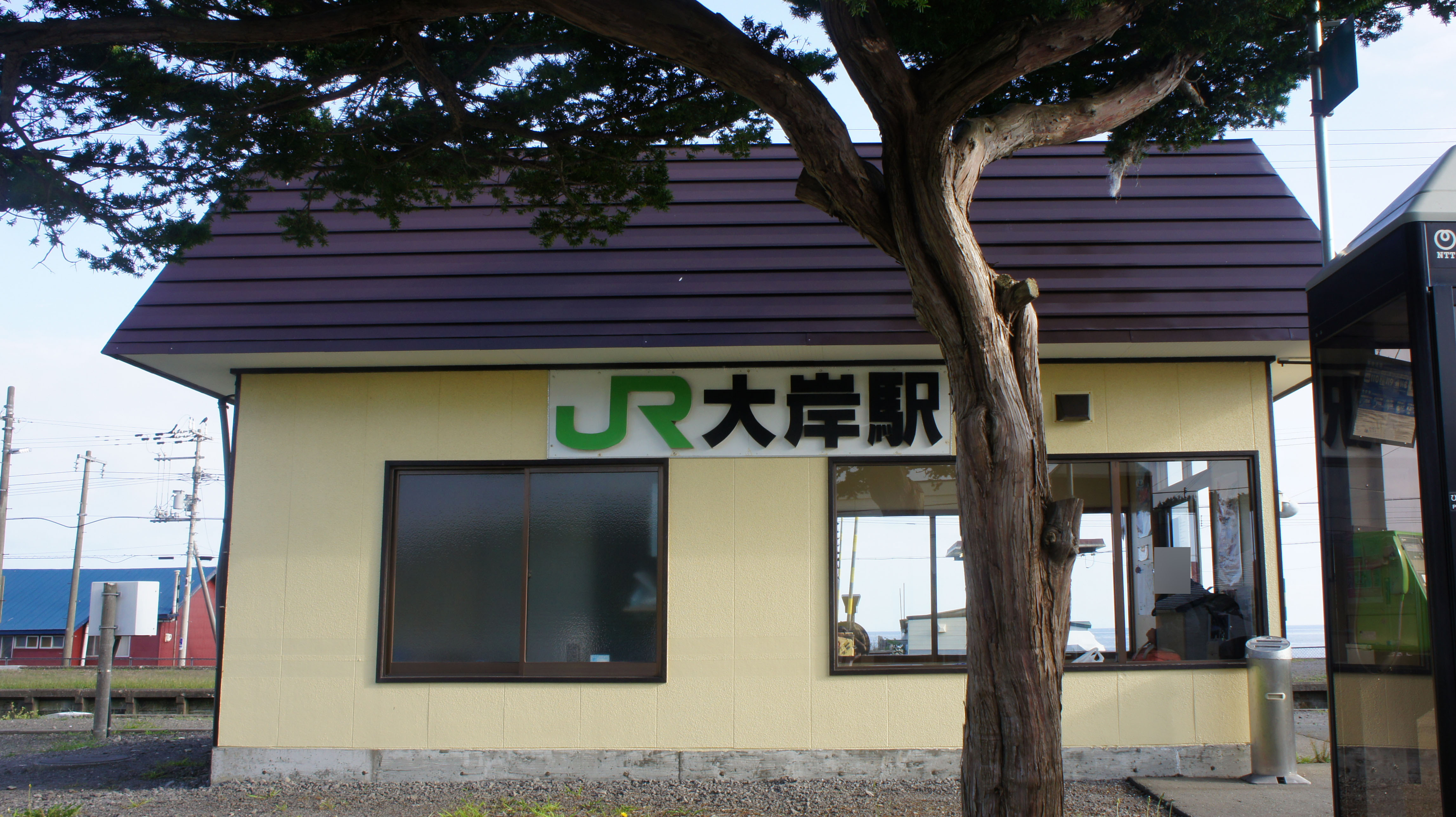

Ōkishi Station (大岸駅, Ōkishi-eki) is a train station in Toyoura, Abuta District, Hokkaidō, Japan.

== Lines ==
- Hokkaido Railway Company
  - Muroran Main Line Station H43

== History ==
=== Future plans ===
In June 2023, this station was selected to be among 42 stations on the JR Hokkaido network to be slated for abolition owing to low ridership.

== Adjacent stations ==
«	Service	»
Muroran Main Line
Rebun	-	Toyoura
