= Bokoi Station =

Railway station in Muroran, Hokkaido, Japan

Coordinates: 42.3171°N 140.9895°E

Bokoi Station (母恋駅, Bokoi-eki) is a train station in Muroran, Hokkaidō, Japan.

== History ==
Year 1934, residents petitioned for the opening of a simple station (only the lowest grade diesel trains stop here).

Year 1940, The train station Added a baggage handle service.

Year 1980, Baggage service ended

Year 1987, JNR (Japanese National Railways) pass down this station to JR 北海道 (Japanese Railway Hokkaido)

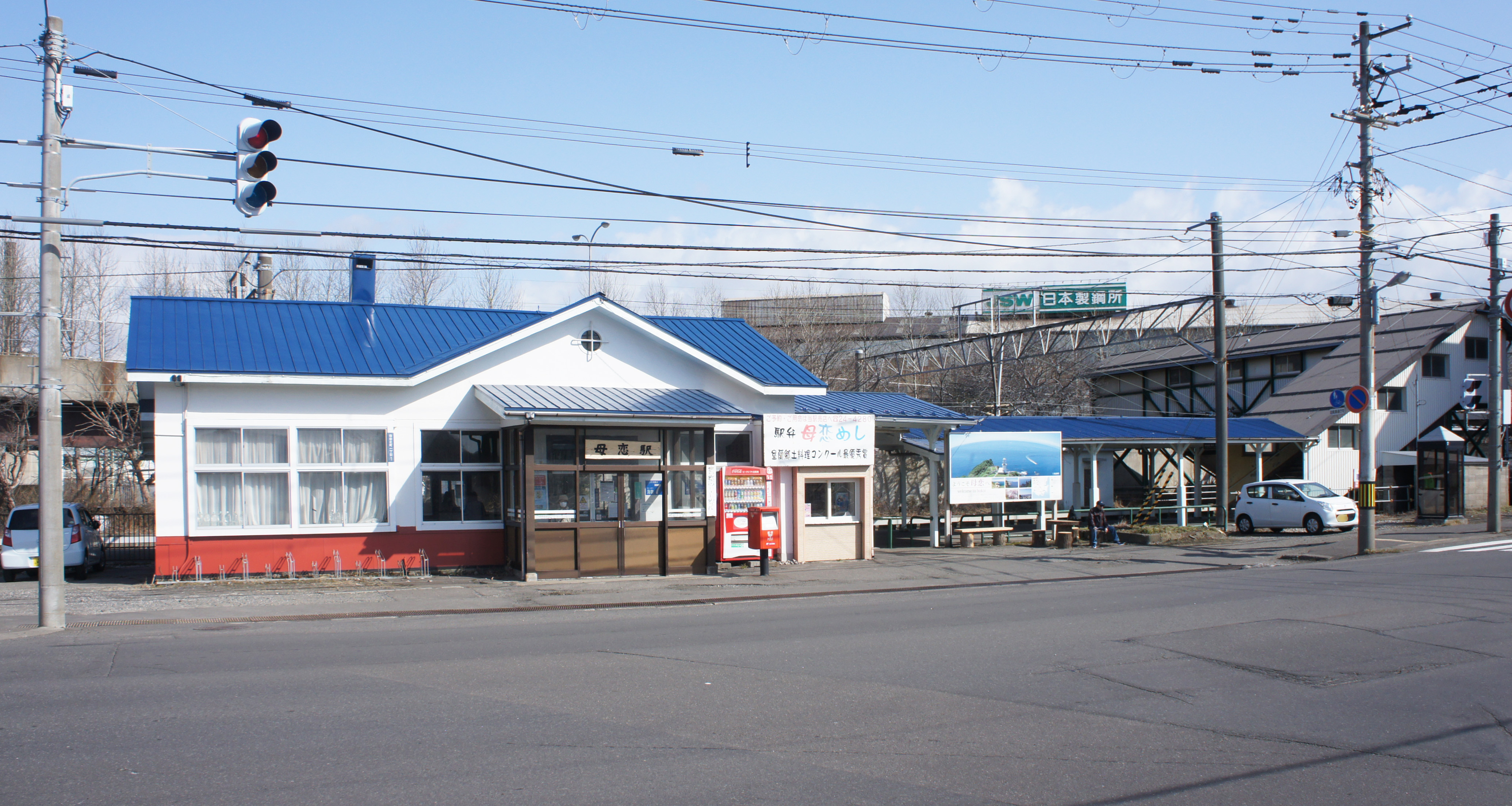
Bokoi Station Building

== Lines ==
- Hokkaido Railway Company
  - Muroran Main Line Station M35

== Adjacent stations ==
«	Service	»
Muroran Main Line
Misaki	-	Muroran
