= Usa Marine Biological Institute =

Research institute in Japan

Usa Marine Biological Institute (Japanese: 高知大学 海洋生物教育研究センター)
- Type: Public
- Established: 1953, August 1
- President: Izumi Kinoshita
- Academic staff: 4
- Undergraduates: 30
- Postgraduates: 7
- Doctoral students: 3
- Location: Usa, Kochi, Japan

The Usa Marine Biological Institute (UMBI) (sometimes referred to as MBI-Japan, Japanese Marine Biological Institute, Usa Kaiyo Center or just Usa) is one of the oldest and largest centers for phycology, marine biology research, graduate training, and public service in Japan. It is devoted to scientific research leading to MS and PhD degrees in phycology, marine biology and related fields. It grants degrees jointly with Kochi University.

UMBI is located in the village of Usa cho, Kōchi Prefecture, Japan.

== History ==
The Usa Marine Biological Station was founded in 1953 as an independent research institute. The Usa Fisheries Laboratory was founded in 1968. In 1978, the two organizations were merged to form the Usa Marine Biological Institute.

In parallel, its main publication, Reports of the Usa Marine Biological Station (July 1954–1978), became the Reports of the Usa Marine Biological Institute starting with the March 1979 issue.

Usa Marine Biological Institute researchers, 1963

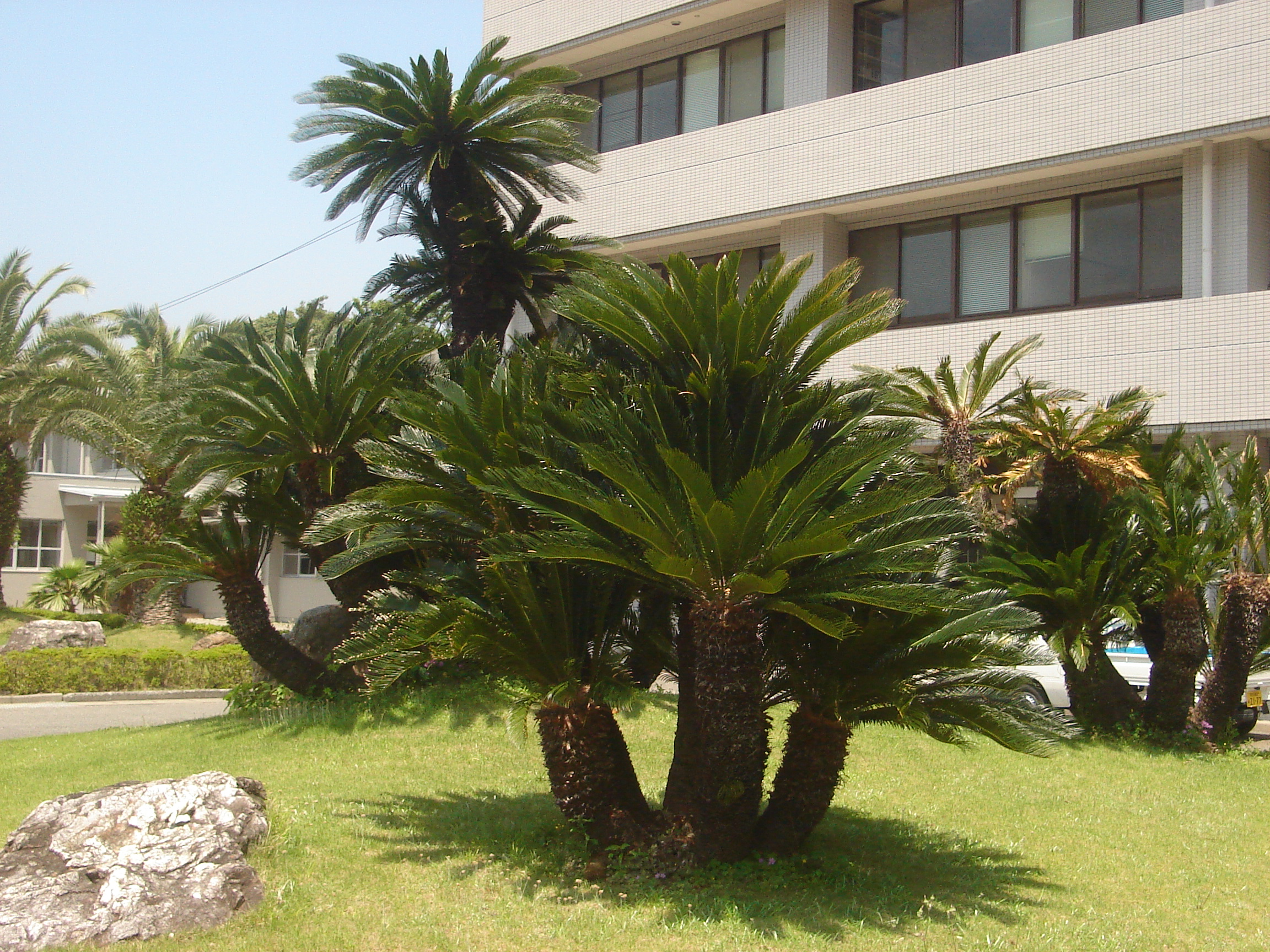
Usa Marine Biological Institute pier

Under the directorship of Professor Masao Ohno, the institute established a Japan International Cooperation Agency (JICA) training program in marine biology, since when a large number of foreign researchers have come to the institute to pursue short-term research projects. The current director, Professor Izumi Kinoshita, supervises and coordinates the JICA training program.

In 2004, UMBI started a new graduate program, Kuroshio Sciences, jointly with Kochi University, to study the Kuroshio Current from an interdisciplinary perspective.

UMBI graduate students are supported by various financial aid schemes, especially the Monbukagakusho MEXT International PhD Program.

== Vessels ==
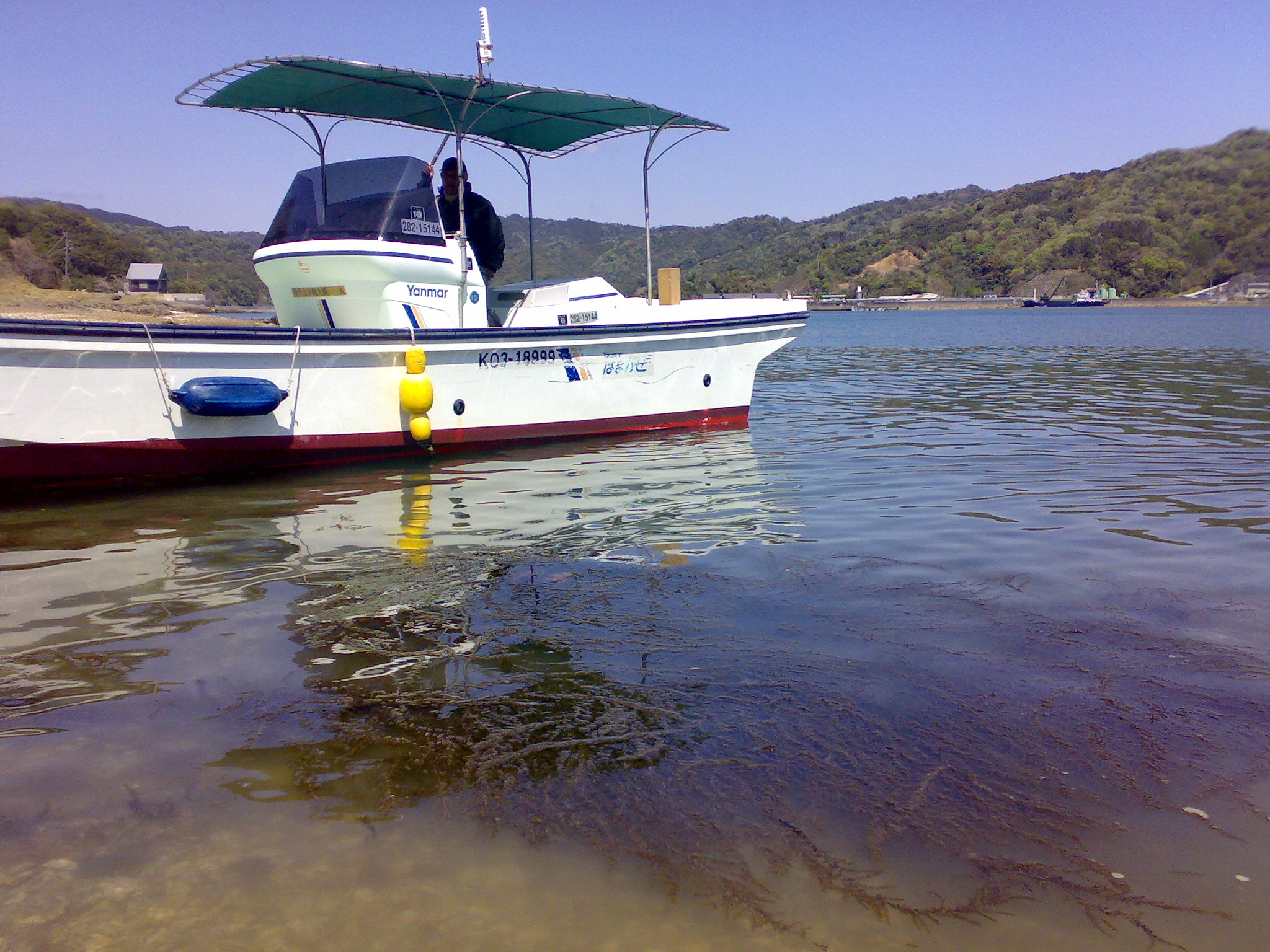
Capt Yano on board R/V Hamayu

UMBI operates several crewed research vessels and vehicles, owned by Kochi University or the Japanese Government:

- R/V Yutaka Hata Maru
- R/V Neptune
- R/V Hamayu
- R/V Triton

== Laboratories ==
UMBI current and past directors

- Early life-history of fishes
- Zooplankton Ecology
- Crustacean Ecology
- Marine Phycology

=== Phycological research ===
Ulva prolifera Scale-up photobioreactors installed at Muroto facility.

Mr Ooki, a seaweed farmer cultivating Monostroma latissimum in the Shimanto estuary

Usa Marine Biological Institute is renowned for marine phycological research. Emeritus Professor Masao Ohno was the first person in Japan to use an artificial seeding method for the commercial cultivation of green algae. The institute is one of the pioneer research institutes in the world for the study of Ulvophycean algae and has state-of-art facilities for marine phycological research.

Contemporary marine phycology research in the UMBI focuses on culture studies to establish life-histories of Ulvophycean algae (Ulva and Monostroma), tank cultivation of Ulva using deep seawater (conducted jointly with the Deep Seawater Research Center, Muroto, Japan) and the ecology of Ecklonia and Sargasm species in the Pacific Ocean.

== Notable alumni ==
- Masao Ohno
- Professor Nakauchi
- Professor Yamaoka

== See also ==
- The Scripps Institution of Oceanography is a similar research facility located in La Jolla, California.
- The Woods Hole Oceanographic Institution is a similar oceanographic facility located at Woods Hole in Massachusetts.
- The Institute of Algological Research is a similar phycological research institute also located in Japan
- The Friday Harbor Laboratories in the United States conducts similar research in marine biology.
