= Usa, Kōchi =

Dissolved municipality in Kōchi prefecture, Japan

Coordinates: 33.4495°N 133.4460°E

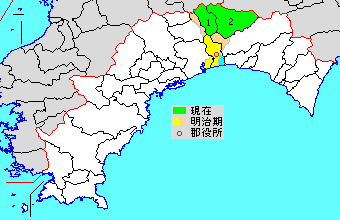
Map of Kōchi Prefecture

Usa (宇佐町, Usa-chō) is an area of the city of Tosa, Kōchi Prefecture, Japan.

Usa is famous for the exquisite Usa beach, Niyodo surfing and paragliding spots, tranquility of the town by the Pacific Ocean and as a home for the world famous Usa Marine Biological Institute. Usa attracts a large number of international tourists annually as a destination to feel the rustic Japanese life-style in a classy fishing village.

== History ==
Usa was an independent town until 1958 when the town was merged with the town of Takaoka and a village forming the town of Takaoka, Takaoka District. Takaoka was promoted to city status and its name changed to Tosa in 1959.

== Geography ==
Usa comprises the mouth part of the Uranouchi inlet of the Pacific Ocean. It is the most famous fishing harbor in Kōchi Prefecture and an important tourist destination. Usa is surrounded by hillocks and mountain ranges to the north, and looks out over the Pacific Ocean to the south.

== See also ==
- Yosakoi Festival
- Usa Marine Biological Institute
