= Japan National Route 230 =

National highway in Japan

National Route 230
- 国道230号
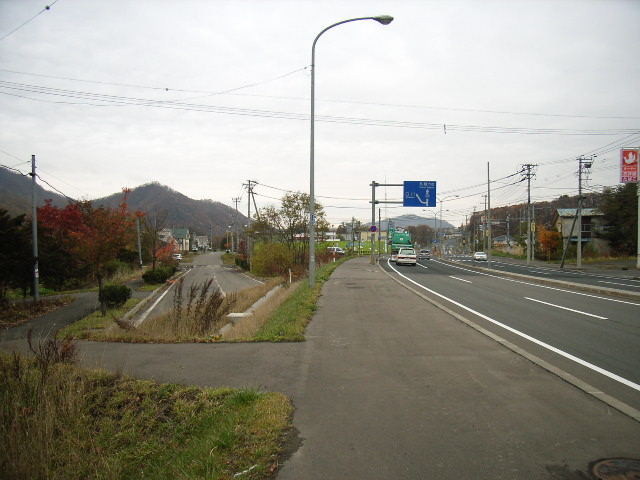

Route information
- Length: 195.4 km (121.4 mi)

Location
- Country: Japan

Highway system
- National highways of Japan; Expressways of Japan
← National Route 229	→ National Route 231

National Route 230 is a national highway of Japan connecting Chūō-ku, Sapporo and Setana, Hokkaido in Japan, with a total length of 195.4 km (121.42 mi).
