= Muroran =

Muroran 室蘭市
- City
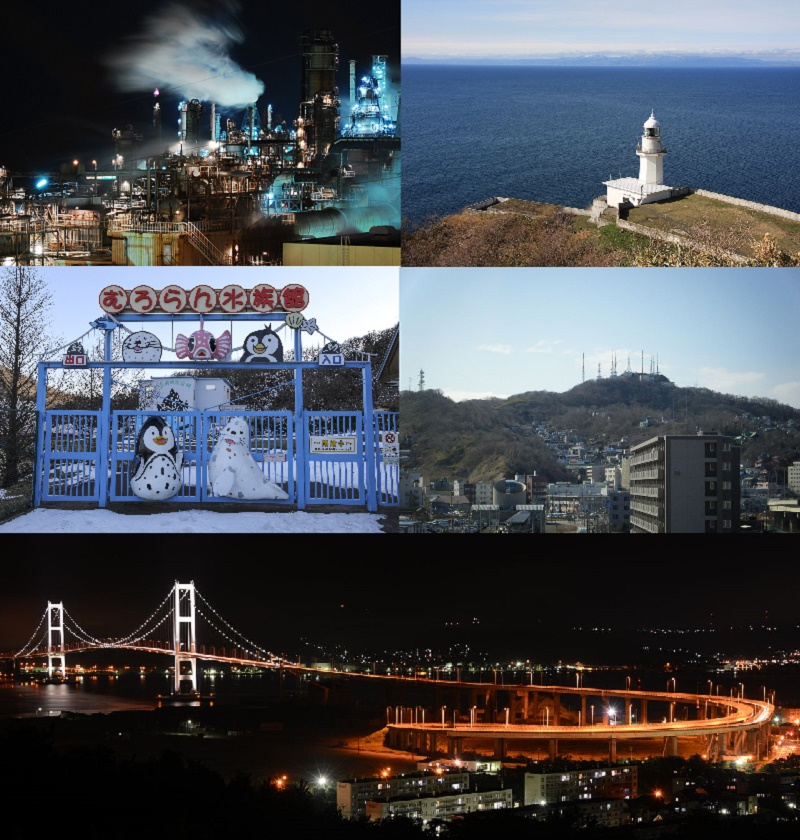
- Top:View of Muroran Refinery area at night, Cape of Chikyu and view of Pacific Ocean, (left to right) Middle:Muroran Aquarium, View of Muroran Station area and Mount Sokuryō, (left to right) Bottom:Night view of Hakuchō Bridge

- Flag Chapter

- Location of Muroran in Hokkaido (Iburi Subprefecture)

- Location in Japan
- Coordinates: 42°19′N 140°58′E
- Country: Japan
- Region: Hokkaido
- Prefecture: Hokkaido (Iburi Subprefecture)
- Established: January 1593
- City Status: August 1, 1922

Government
  - Mayor: Takeshi Aoyama (since May 2011)

Area
  - Total: 80.88 km^{2} (31.23 sq mi)

Population (January 31, 2024)
  - Total: 76,385
  - Density: 944.4/km^{2} (2,446/sq mi)
- Time zone: UTC+09:00 (JST)
- City hall address: 1-2 Saiwaichō, Muroran-shi, Hokkaidō; 051-8511
- Website: www.city.muroran.lg.jp
- Symbols
- Bird: Coal tit
- Fish: Rockfish
- Flower: Azalea
- Tree: Japanese rowan

Muroran (室蘭市, Muroran-shi) is a city and port located in Iburi Subprefecture, Hokkaido, Japan. It is the capital city of Iburi Subprefecture. As of January 31, 2024, the city had an estimated population of 76,385, with 43,494 households and a population density of 944 people per square kilometre (2,440 per square mile). The total area is 80.88 km^{2} (31.23 sq mi).

== History ==
The origin of Muroran's name is derived from the Ainu word "Mo Ruerani", which means "the bottom of a little slope". The little slope, in front of the former Senkai Temple in Sakimori-cho, is noted in connection with the name of Muroran.

In the late 16th century, the Muroran region came under the administration of the Matsumae clan. Muroran was developed as a trading post between the Ainu and the Matsumae clan people.

In 1892, the Port of Muroran was opened for the wooden bridge construction at Kaigan (former Tokikaramoi); at the same time, the main road began construction from Hakodate to Sapporo as the first step of Hokkaido Colonization Plan.

An Imperial decree in July 1899 established Muroran as an open port for trading with the United States and the United Kingdom.

With the opening of a ship route from Muroran to Mori and railroad extension to Iwamizawa, Muroran's municipality was started on August 1, 1922 as the core of the major land and sea traffic in the pioneer era of Hokkaido. Since then, Muroran has been developing as an important transportation hub and a center of the steel industry. This unfortunately earned the town's industrial plants a bombardment by some of the newest American battleships in July 1945, in the closing days of World War II. Muroran was also bombed by American naval aircraft on 14 and 15 July 1945, 525 people were killed.

Today, there are large cement factories, steel mills, oil refineries, and shipyards clustered around the port of Muroran.

== Climate ==
Muroran features a warm-summer humid continental climate (Köppen climate classification Dfb—Cfb Oceanic Climate if the −3 °C or 27 °F isotherm is used), a climate type that is very rare in Japan. Despite it being located on Hokkaido, Muroran typically does not see the very cold winters that the majority of the island is known for, yet it does experience some snowfall in the course of the year, averaging roughly 210 cm (83 in) of snow per season. Summers in Muroran are mild by Japanese standards, not nearly as hot as summers in other Japanese cities. Average high temperatures in August, the city's warmest month, is around 24 °C (75 °F).

Climate data for Muroran (elevation 39.9 m, 1991–2020 normals, extremes 1923–present)
| Month | Jan | Feb | Mar | Apr | May | Jun | Jul | Aug | Sep | Oct | Nov | Dec | Year |
|---|---|---|---|---|---|---|---|---|---|---|---|---|---|
| Record high °C (°F) | 9.8 (49.6) | 13.8 (56.8) | 16.7 (62.1) | 23.1 (73.6) | 27.6 (81.7) | 28.7 (83.7) | 32.7 (90.9) | 32.8 (91.0) | 31.0 (87.8) | 25.8 (78.4) | 21.4 (70.5) | 14.4 (57.9) | 32.8 (91.0) |
| Mean maximum °C (°F) | 6.0 (42.8) | 6.4 (43.5) | 11.5 (52.7) | 17.4 (63.3) | 22.7 (72.9) | 24.9 (76.8) | 28.0 (82.4) | 28.9 (84.0) | 26.5 (79.7) | 20.9 (69.6) | 16.5 (61.7) | 10.0 (50.0) | 29.3 (84.7) |
| Mean daily maximum °C (°F) | 0.6 (33.1) | 1.0 (33.8) | 4.6 (40.3) | 10.1 (50.2) | 14.9 (58.8) | 18.0 (64.4) | 21.6 (70.9) | 23.6 (74.5) | 21.5 (70.7) | 16.1 (61.0) | 9.3 (48.7) | 2.9 (37.2) | 12.0 (53.6) |
| Daily mean °C (°F) | −1.8 (28.8) | −1.6 (29.1) | 1.4 (34.5) | 6.1 (43.0) | 10.7 (51.3) | 14.4 (57.9) | 18.5 (65.3) | 20.6 (69.1) | 18.4 (65.1) | 12.9 (55.2) | 6.4 (43.5) | 0.5 (32.9) | 8.9 (48.0) |
| Mean daily minimum °C (°F) | −4.0 (24.8) | −4.0 (24.8) | −1.3 (29.7) | 3.0 (37.4) | 7.6 (45.7) | 11.9 (53.4) | 16.4 (61.5) | 18.6 (65.5) | 15.7 (60.3) | 9.8 (49.6) | 3.5 (38.3) | −1.8 (28.8) | 6.3 (43.3) |
| Mean minimum °C (°F) | −8.6 (16.5) | −8.4 (16.9) | −5.6 (21.9) | −0.8 (30.6) | 3.6 (38.5) | 8.4 (47.1) | 13.0 (55.4) | 15.2 (59.4) | 10.7 (51.3) | 4.2 (39.6) | −2.9 (26.8) | −6.9 (19.6) | −9.3 (15.3) |
| Record low °C (°F) | −13.4 (7.9) | −13.4 (7.9) | −9.6 (14.7) | −5.8 (21.6) | 0.0 (32.0) | 4.6 (40.3) | 8.5 (47.3) | 11.5 (52.7) | 5.9 (42.6) | −2.2 (28.0) | −7.2 (19.0) | −12.9 (8.8) | −13.4 (7.9) |
| Average precipitation mm (inches) | 53.6 (2.11) | 44.3 (1.74) | 49.9 (1.96) | 70.0 (2.76) | 108.3 (4.26) | 109.1 (4.30) | 159.2 (6.27) | 187.3 (7.37) | 156.6 (6.17) | 101.8 (4.01) | 83.2 (3.28) | 65.8 (2.59) | 1,188.9 (46.81) |
| Average snowfall cm (inches) | 49 (19) | 45 (18) | 27 (11) | 4 (1.6) | 0 (0) | 0 (0) | 0 (0) | 0 (0) | 0 (0) | 0 (0) | 5 (2.0) | 27 (11) | 157 (62) |
| Average precipitation days (≥ 0.5 mm) | 17.4 | 14.7 | 13.2 | 11.1 | 11.4 | 11.3 | 13.1 | 12.9 | 12.4 | 13.2 | 16.7 | 18.1 | 165.4 |
| Average snowy days | 28.6 | 25.1 | 21.4 | 6.8 | 0.1 | 0.0 | 0.0 | 0.0 | 0.0 | 1.3 | 12.6 | 26.8 | 122.1 |
| Average relative humidity (%) | 70 | 72 | 72 | 75 | 80 | 88 | 90 | 89 | 82 | 74 | 71 | 70 | 78 |
| Mean monthly sunshine hours | 88.3 | 123.6 | 183.7 | 198.9 | 194.9 | 155.8 | 133.2 | 144.9 | 166.5 | 165.2 | 102.7 | 71.1 | 1,728.1 |
Source: Japan Meteorological Agency (1991–2020 normals, extremes 1923–present)

== Scenic spots ==
- Hakucho Bridge spans the Port of Muroran and is the largest suspension bridge in eastern Japan.
- Itanki Beach
- Mount Washibetsu

Muroran holds eight specific scenic sights called Muroran-Hakke (室蘭八景). The most famous of them is the Earth Cape (地球岬, chikyū misaki).

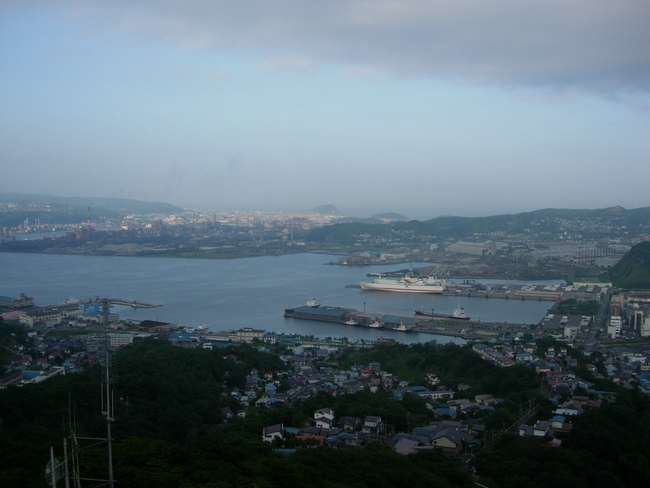
A view of Muroran

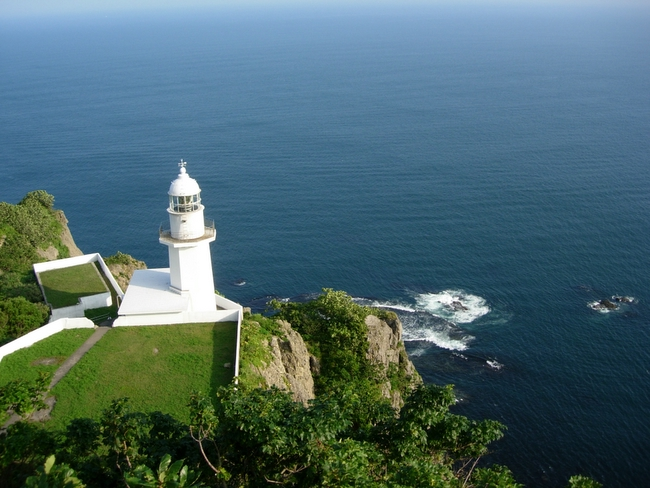
Chikyu Misaki

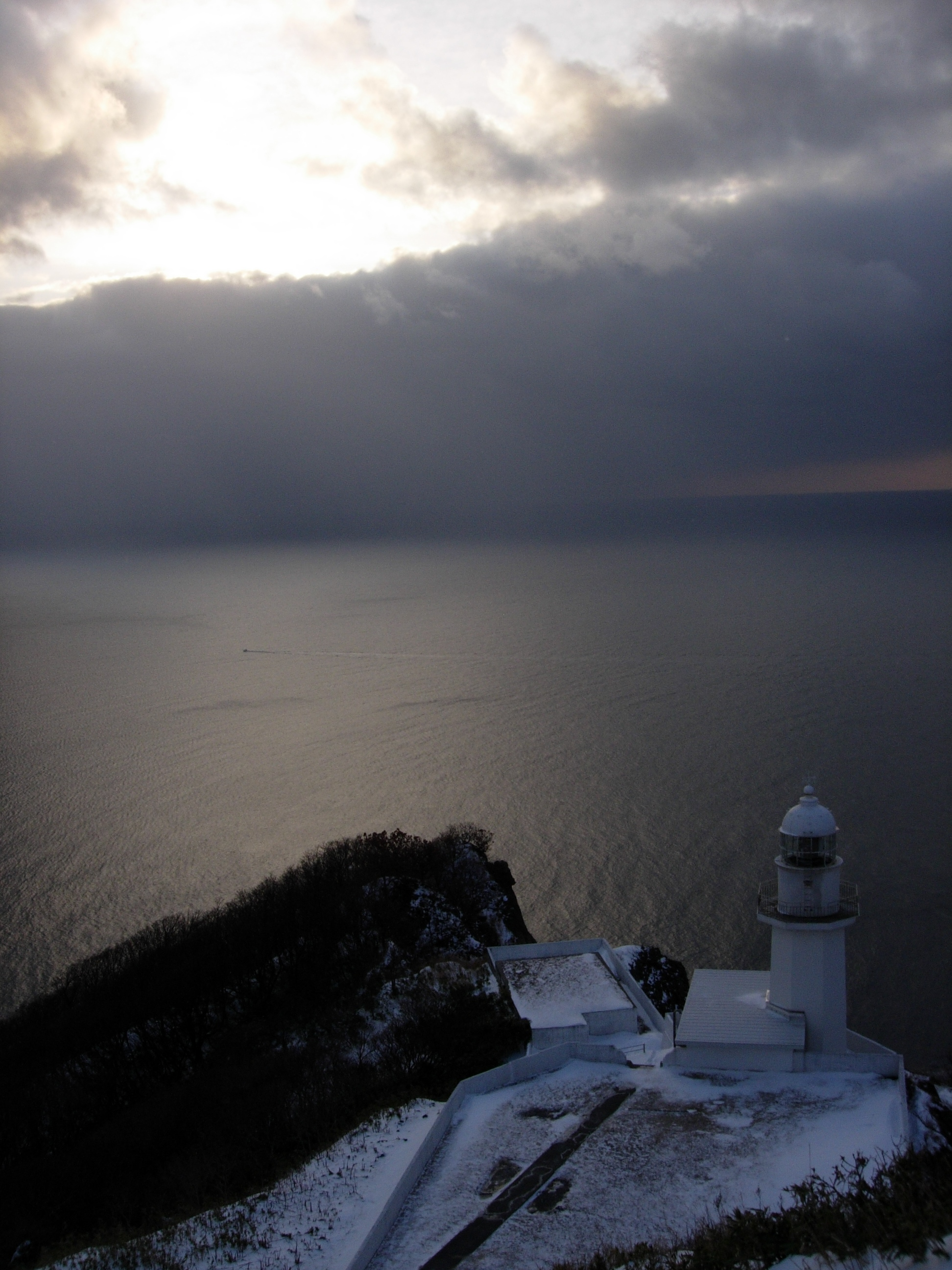
Chikyu Misaki in winter

== Transportation ==
There are five JR Hokkaido stations in Muroran, starting from Higashi Muroran and ending in downtown Muroran, which can be used to access both Hakodate to the South West, and Sapporo to the North East.

- Muroran Main Line : Sakimori - Moto-Wanishi - Higashi-Muroran
- Muroran Branch Line : Higashi-Muroran - Wanishi - Misaki - Bokoi - Muroran

== Economy ==
Japan Steel Works has its global headquarters in Muroran.

== Education ==
Muroran houses one of the most prominent Marine Biology institutes in Japan, the Institute of Algological Research of Hokkaido University.

=== Universities ===
- Muroran Institute of Technology

=== High schools ===
==== Public ====
- Hokkaido Muroran Sakae High School
- Hokkaido Muroran Shimizugaoka High School
- Hokkaido Muroran Technical High School
- Hokkaido Muroran Tosho High School

==== Private ====
- Hokkaido Ootani Muroran High School
- Kaisei Gakuin High School

== Notable people ==
- Asami Abe – singer, actress. Younger sister of Natsumi Abe.
- Asami Chida - missing student
- Natsumi Abe – idol, singer, actress. Hello! Project soloist. former Morning Musume member.
- Kaori Iida – singer. Hello! Project soloist. former Morning Musume member.
- Satoru Iwata – Previous CEO of Nintendo, Former HAL lab CEO and Game Designer
- Shoji Jo – footballer
- Yoshiro Kitahara - Japanese actor
- Kuryu Matsuki - footballer, currently plays for EFL Championship side Southampton

== Sister cities ==
- (Japan) Shizuoka, Shizuoka, since 1976
- (United States) Knoxville, Tennessee, since 1991
- (Japan) Joetsu, Niigata, since 1995
