= Toyoura, Hokkaido =

Toyoura 豊浦町
- Town
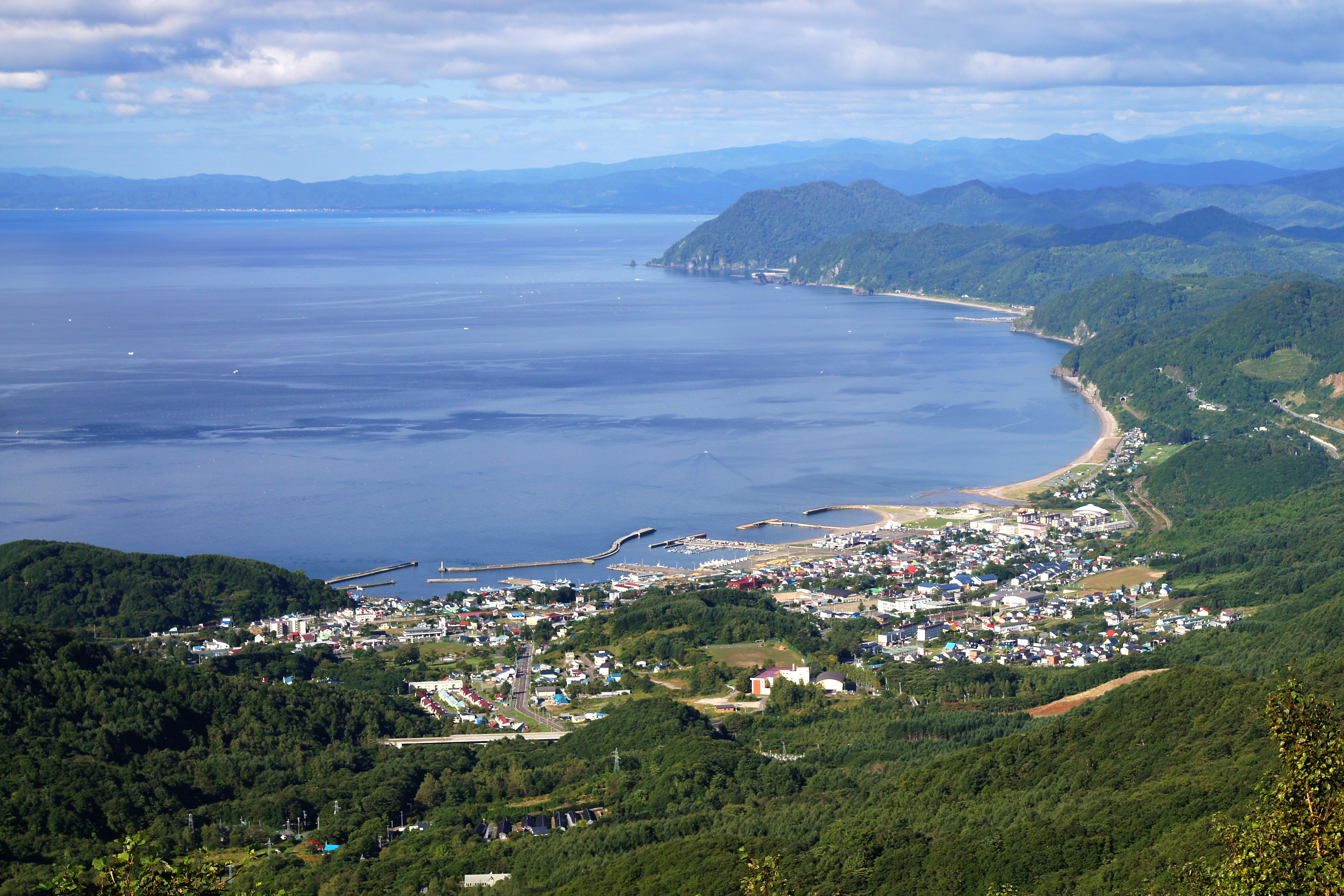
- View of Toyoura

- Flag Seal

- Location of Toyoura in Hokkaido (Iburi Subprefecture)

- Location in Japan
- Coordinates: 42°35′N 140°43′E
- Country: Japan
- Region: Hokkaido
- Prefecture: Hokkaido (Iburi Subprefecture)
- District: Abuta

Area
  - Total: 233.54 km^{2} (90.17 sq mi)

Population (September 30, 2016)
  - Total: 4,205
  - Density: 18.01/km^{2} (46.63/sq mi)
- Time zone: UTC+09:00 (JST)
- Climate: Dfb
- Website: www.town.toyoura.hokkaido.jp

Toyoura (豊浦町, Toyoura-chō) is a town located in Iburi Subprefecture, Hokkaido, Japan.

As of September 2016, the town has an estimated population of 4,205, and a density of 18 persons per km^{2}. The total area is 233.54 km^{2}.

== Climate ==
Climate data for Ōkishi, Toyoura (1991−2020 normals, extremes 1977−present)
Month	Jan	Feb	Mar	Apr	May	Jun	Jul	Aug	Sep	Oct	Nov	Dec	Year
Record high °C (°F)	8.3 (46.9)	10.4 (50.7)	14.8 (58.6)	21.7 (71.1)	28.7 (83.7)	29.3 (84.7)	33.6 (92.5)	32.7 (90.9)	30.4 (86.7)	25.6 (78.1)	19.3 (66.7)	14.7 (58.5)	33.6 (92.5)
Mean daily maximum °C (°F)	0.1 (32.2)	0.6 (33.1)	4.3 (39.7)	10.3 (50.5)	15.5 (59.9)	19.0 (66.2)	22.8 (73.0)	24.7 (76.5)	22.3 (72.1)	16.4 (61.5)	8.9 (48.0)	2.1 (35.8)	12.3 (54.0)
Daily mean °C (°F)	−4.0 (24.8)	−3.6 (25.5)	0.0 (32.0)	5.2 (41.4)	10.4 (50.7)	14.8 (58.6)	19.1 (66.4)	20.7 (69.3)	17.2 (63.0)	10.6 (51.1)	4.1 (39.4)	−1.8 (28.8)	7.7 (45.9)
Mean daily minimum °C (°F)	−8.8 (16.2)	−8.7 (16.3)	−4.9 (23.2)	−0.2 (31.6)	5.3 (41.5)	11.0 (51.8)	15.9 (60.6)	17.1 (62.8)	12.3 (54.1)	5.2 (41.4)	−0.6 (30.9)	−6.0 (21.2)	3.1 (37.6)
Record low °C (°F)	−20.3 (−4.5)	−20.6 (−5.1)	−17.0 (1.4)	−10.0 (14.0)	−2.8 (27.0)	2.2 (36.0)	6.7 (44.1)	7.9 (46.2)	2.5 (36.5)	−3.0 (26.6)	−11.5 (11.3)	−20.0 (−4.0)	−20.6 (−5.1)
Average precipitation mm (inches)	70.2 (2.76)	64.2 (2.53)	59.5 (2.34)	69.2 (2.72)	94.8 (3.73)	84.8 (3.34)	134.1 (5.28)	162.2 (6.39)	149.1 (5.87)	108.5 (4.27)	107.1 (4.22)	87.3 (3.44)	1,190.9 (46.89)
Average snowfall cm (inches)	158 (62)	137 (54)	94 (37)	8 (3.1)	0 (0)	0 (0)	0 (0)	0 (0)	0 (0)	0 (0)	37 (15)	134 (53)	571 (225)
Average precipitation days (≥ 1.0 mm)	16.9	14.8	12.8	10.1	10.2	8.6	10.3	11.0	11.1	12.4	14.6	17.4	150.2
Average snowy days	18.1	16.4	12.6	1.2	0	0	0	0	0	0	4.1	15.1	67.5
Mean monthly sunshine hours	105.9	109.0	152.5	188.1	191.9	149.2	124.5	141.5	166.9	155.6	111.8	99.0	1,696
Source: JMA

== Notable people from Toyoura ==
- Daisuke Naito, former professional boxer
