= Hokkaido =

Island, prefecture, and region of Japan

- Prefecture and region

Japanese transcription(s)
  - Kanji: 北海道
  - Rōmaji: Hokkaidō

Ainu transcription(s)
  - Katakana: アイヌ モシㇼ or ヤウン モシㇼ
  - Latin script: aynu mosir or yaun mosir
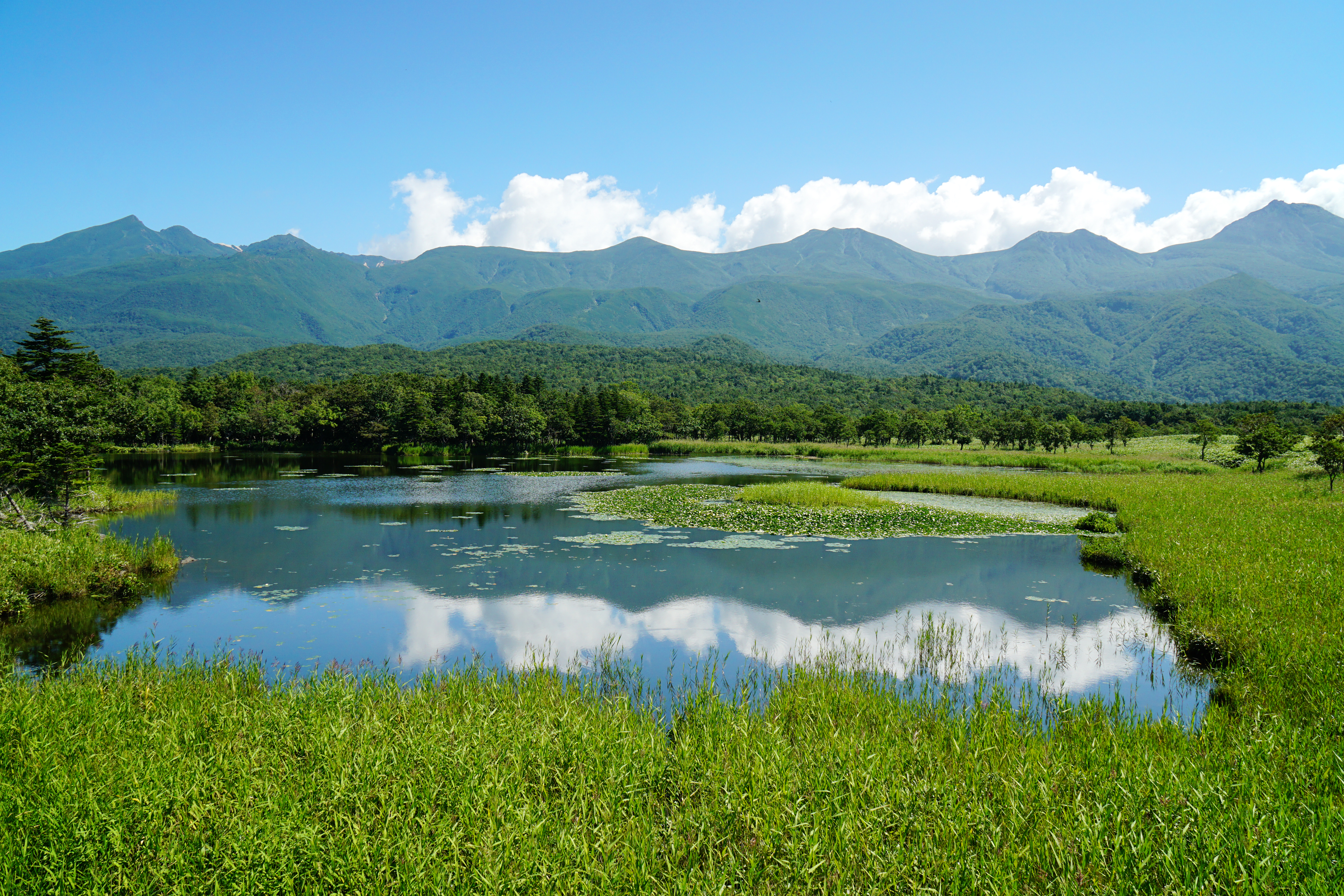
- Shiretoko National Park

- Flag Symbol
- Anthem: Hikari afurete, Mukashi no mukashi and Hokkai bayashi
- Coordinates: 43°N 142°E
- Country: Japan
- Island: Hokkaido
- Region: Hokkaido
- Capital: Sapporo
- Largest city: Sapporo
- Subdivisions: Districts: 74, Municipalities: 179

Government
  - Body: Hokkaido Legislative Assembly
  - Governor: Naomichi Suzuki

Area
  - Total: 83,423.84 km^{2} (32,210.12 sq mi)
  - Rank: 1st

Population (October 1, 2025)
  - Total: 4,985,419
  - Rank: 9th
  - Density: 59.76012/km^{2} (154.7780/sq mi)

GDP (2022)
  - Total: JPY 20,889 billion USD 154.3 billion
- ISO 3166 code: JP-01
- Website: www.pref.hokkaido.lg.jp
- Symbols of Hokkaido
- Bird: Tanchō (red-crowned crane, Grus japonensis)
- Flower: Hamanasu (rugosa rose, Rosa rugosa)
- Mascot: Kyun-chan (キュンちゃん)
- Tree: Ezomatsu (Jezo spruce, Picea jezoensis)

Hokkaido (Note: Japanese: 北海道, Hepburn: Hokkaidō; pronounced [hò̞k̚.kä́ì.dò̞ò̞], lit. 'Northern Sea Circuit'; Ainu: アイヌ モシㇼ, aynu mosir, transl. 'land of the Ainu', lit. 'land of the humans', also known as Yaunmosir, lit. 'land of land') is the second-largest and northernmost of Japan's four main islands. Together with its surrounding islands, it comprises the largest and northernmost prefecture, making up its own region. The Tsugaru Strait separates Hokkaido from Honshu. The two islands are connected by railway via the Seikan Tunnel.

The largest city on Hokkaido is its capital, Sapporo, which is also its only ordinance-designated city. Sakhalin, Russia, lies about 43 kilometres (27 mi) to the north of Hokkaido. To the east and northeast are the Kuril Islands, which are administered by Russia, although the four southernmost are claimed by Japan. Hokkaido's position on the northern end of the Japanese archipelago results in a colder climate, with the island seeing significant snowfall each winter. Despite the harsher climate, it serves as an agricultural breadbasket for many crops.

Hokkaido was formerly known as Ezo, Ezochi, and Ezogashima. Although Japanese settlers ruled the southern tip of the island since the 16th century, Hokkaido was primarily inhabited by the Ainu people. In 1869, following the Meiji Restoration, the entire island was annexed, colonized, and renamed Hokkaido by Japan. Japanese settlers dispossessed the Ainu of their land and forced them to assimilate. In the 21st century, the Ainu are almost totally assimilated into Japanese society, leading to the near-erasure of their cultural practices, traditions and language.

== Names ==
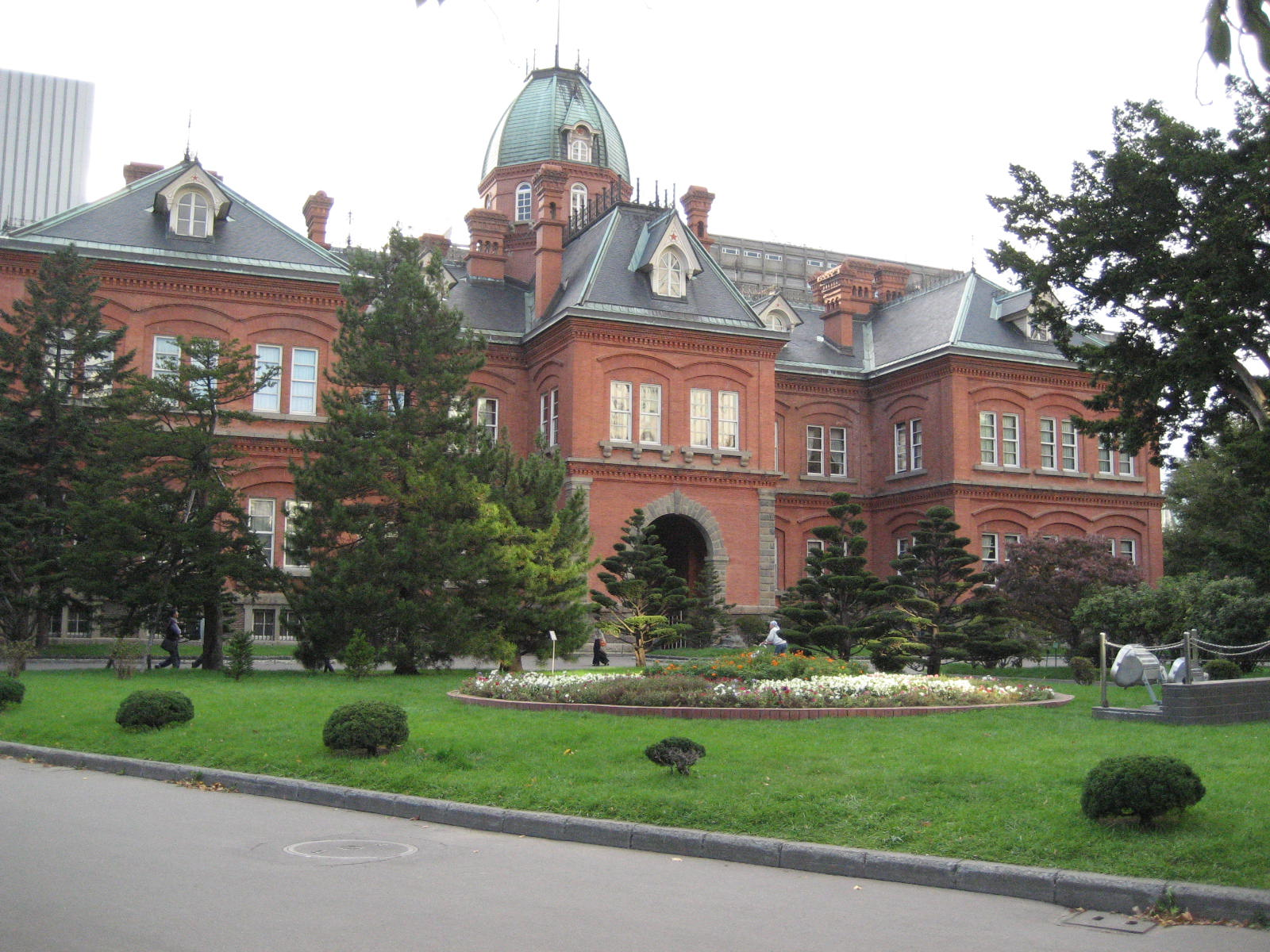
The Former Hokkaido Government Office in Chūō-ku, Sapporo

When establishing the Development Commission, the Meiji government decided to change the name of Ezochi. Matsuura Takeshirō submitted six proposals, including names such as Kaihokudō (海北道) and Hokkaidō (北加伊道), to the government. The government eventually decided to use the name Hokkaido, but decided to write it as 北海道, as a compromise between 海北道 and 北加伊道 because of the similarity with names such as Tōkaidō (東海道). According to Matsuura, the name was thought up because the Ainu called the region Kai. The kai element also strongly resembles the On'yomi, or Sino-Japanese, reading of the characters 蝦夷 (on'yomi as [ka.i, カイ], kun'yomi as [e.mi.ɕi, えみし]), which have been used for over a thousand years in China and Japan as the standard orthographic form to be used when referring to Ainu and related peoples. It is possible that Matsuura's kai was actually an alteration, influenced by the Sino-Japanese reading of 蝦夷 Ka-i, of the Nivkh exonym for the Ainu, namely Qoy (Gilyak pronunciation: [kʰuɣɪ]).

In 1947, Hokkaido became a full-fledged prefecture. The historical suffix 道 (-dō) translates to "prefecture" in English, ambiguously the same as 府 (-fu) for Osaka and Kyoto, and 県 (-ken) for the rest of the prefectures. Dō, as shorthand, can be used to uniquely identify Hokkaido, for example as in 道道 (dōdō, "Hokkaido road") or 道議会 (Dōgikai, "Hokkaido Assembly"), the same way 都 (-to) is used for Tokyo. The prefecture's government calls itself the "Hokkaido Government" rather than the "Hokkaido Prefectural Government".

With the rise of indigenous rights movements, there emerged a notion that Hokkaido should have an Ainu-language name. If a decision to change the name is made, however, whichever Ainu phrase is chosen, its original referent is critically different from the large geographical entity. The phrase aynu mosir (アイヌ モシㇼ) has been a preferred choice among Japanese activists. Its primary meaning is the "land of the humans", as opposed to the "land of the gods" (kamuy mosir). When contrasted with sisam mosir ("land of the neighbors", often pointing to Honshu or Japanese settlements on the southern tip of Hokkaido), it means the land of the Ainu people, which, depending on context, can refer to Hokkaido, although from a modern ethnolinguistic point of view, the Ainu people have extended their domain to a large part of Sakhalin and the entire Kuril Islands. Another phrase, yaun mosir (ヤウン モシㇼ), has gained prominence; it literally means the "onshore land", as opposed to the "offshore land" (repun mosir), which, depending on context, can refer to the Kuril Islands, Honshu, or any foreign country. If the speaker is a resident of Hokkaido, yaun mosir can refer to Hokkaido. Yet another phrase, akor mosir (アコㇿ モシㇼ) means "our (inclusive) land", and when used by Hokkaido Ainus, it can refer to Hokkaido or Japan as a whole.

== History ==
=== Early history ===
During the Jōmon period, the local culture and the associated hunter-gatherer lifestyle flourished in Hokkaido, beginning over 15,000 years ago. In contrast to the island of Honshu, Hokkaido experienced no conflict during this period. Jomon beliefs in natural spirits are theorized to have given rise to Ainu spirituality. About 2,000 years ago, the island was colonized by Yayoi people, and much of the island's population shifted away from hunting and gathering towards agriculture.

The Ebetsu Kofun Cluster is a group of mounds dating from the latter half of the 8th century to the middle of the 9th century, and was surveyed by Juichi Goto in 1931. Along with the kofun, warabitetō (蕨手刀) or 'Emishi sword', magatama, and Sue pottery were discovered. Ebetsu Kofun is evidence for the presence of the Yamato people and trade between Hokkaido and Honshu before the eras of feudal Japan.

An entry in the Nihon Shoki records an event involving Yezo (present-day Hokkaido). According to the text, Abe no Hirafu launched a military campaign that forced the Ainu from Tohoku to Yezo.

According to Emori Susumu, a historian of Hokkaido, Watarishima Emishi people were the ancestors of the present-day Ainu people.

During the Nara and Heian periods (710–1185), people in Hokkaido conducted trade with Dewa Province, an outpost of the Japanese central government. From the feudal period, the people in Hokkaido began to be called Ezo. Hokkaido subsequently became known as Ezochi (蝦夷地; lit. 'Ezo land' or 'Ezo region') or Ezogashima (蝦夷ヶ島; lit. 'Island of the Ezo'). The indigenous people of Ezochi mainly relied upon hunting and fishing and obtained rice and iron through trade with the Japanese.

=== Feudal Japan ===
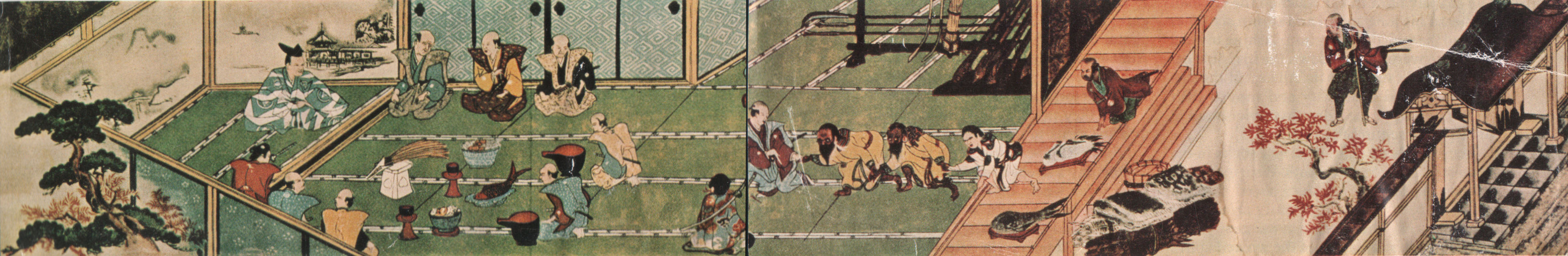
A palace reception near Hakodate in 1751. Ainu bringing gifts (cf. omusha)

During the Muromachi period (1336–1573), the Japanese established a settlement at the south of the Oshima Peninsula, with a series of fortified residences such as that of Shinoridate. As more people moved to the settlement to avoid battles, disputes arose between the Japanese and the Ainu. The disputes eventually developed into a war. In 1457, Takeda Nobuhiro (1431–1494) killed the Ainu leader, Koshamain, and defeated the opposition. Nobuhiro's descendants became the rulers of the Matsumae-han, which was granted exclusive trading rights with the Ainu in the Azuchi-Momoyama and Edo periods (1568–1868). The Matsumae family's economy relied upon trade with the Ainu, who had extensive trading networks. The Matsumae held authority over the south of Ezochi until the end of the Edo period.

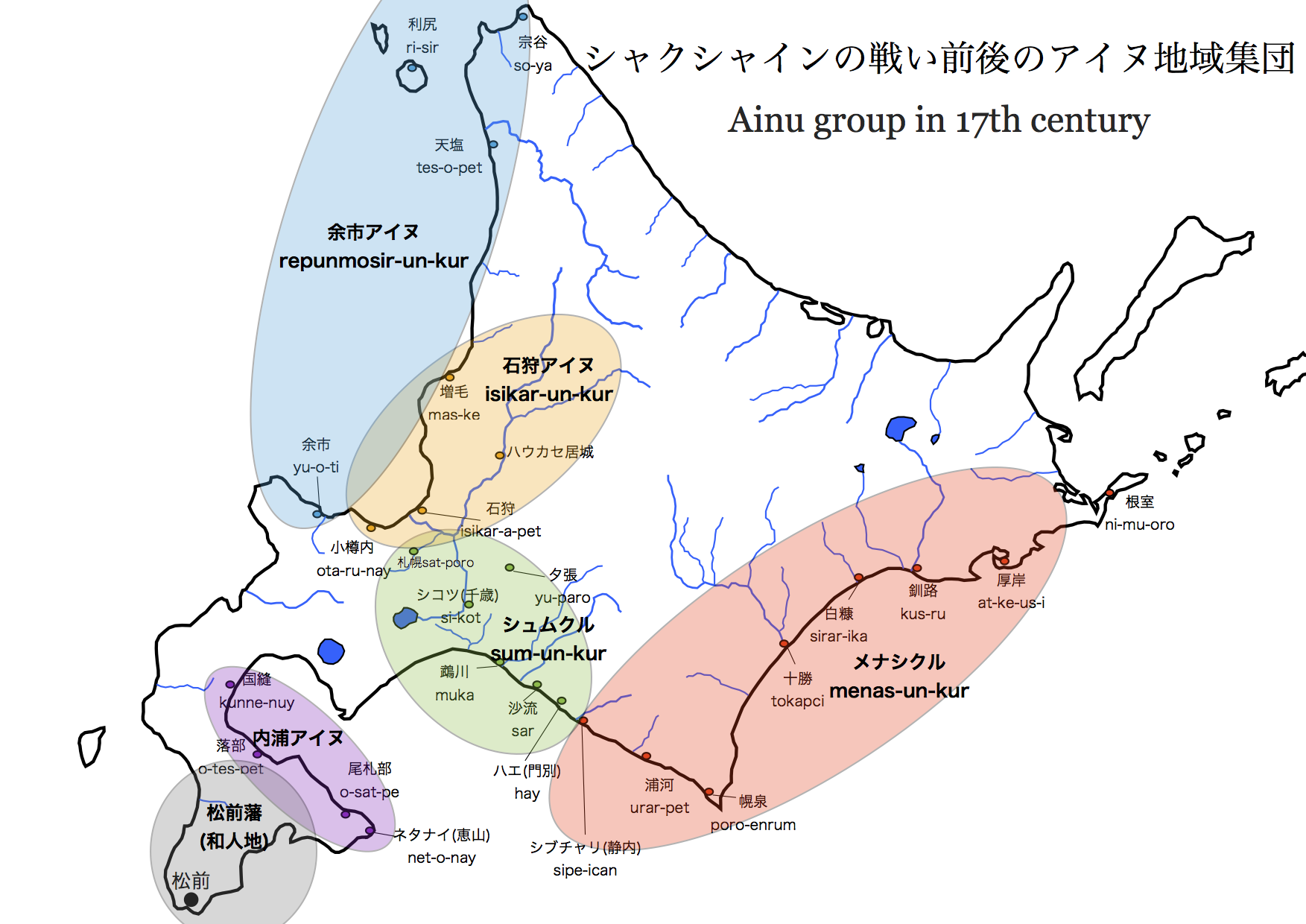
A map of Ainu groups around the time of Shakushain's Revolt (1669–1672)

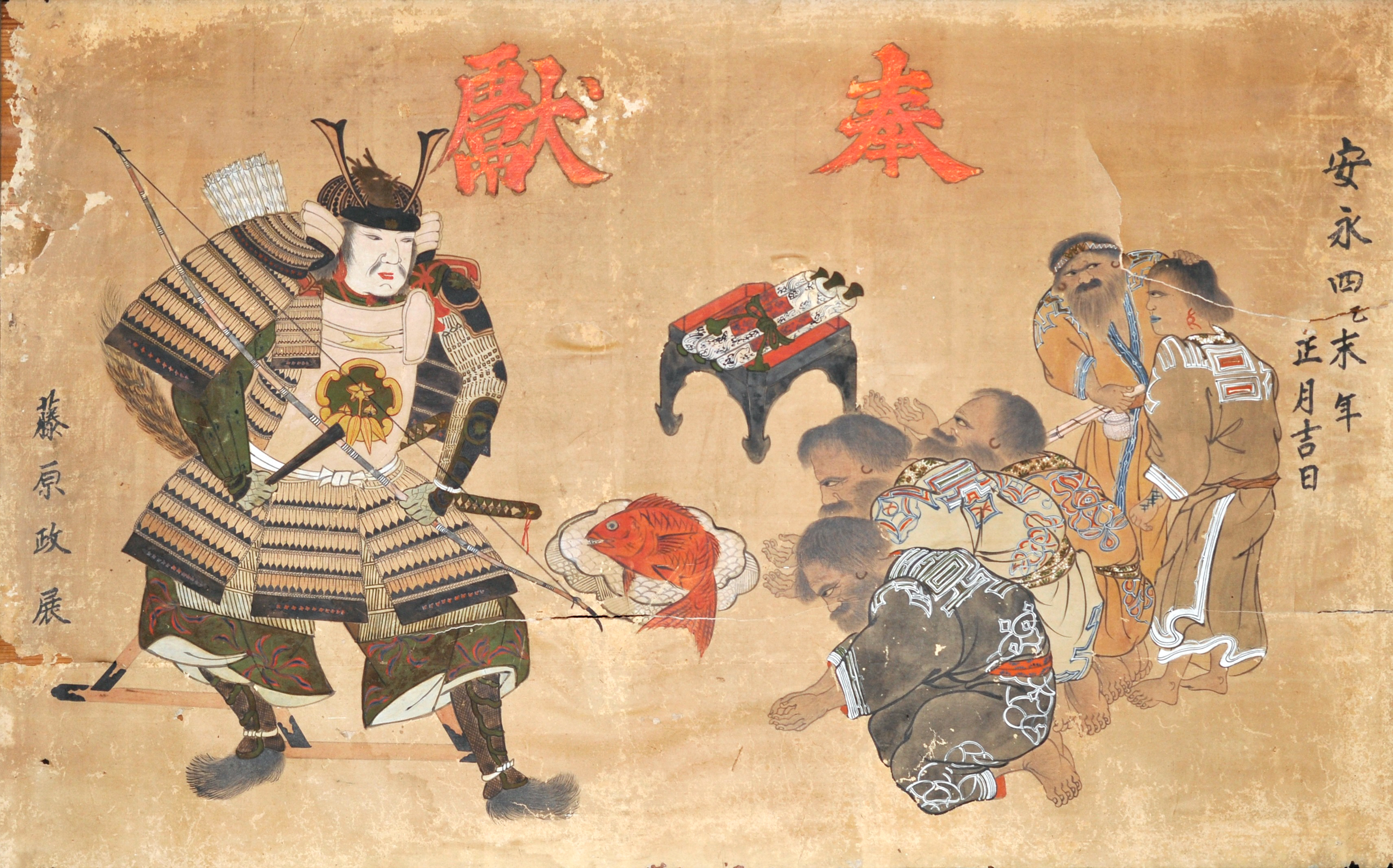
The samurai and the Ainu, c. 1775

The Matsumae clan's rule over the Ainu must be understood in the context of the expansion of the Japanese feudal state. Medieval military leaders in northern Honshu (e.g. Northern Fujiwara, Akita clan) maintained only tenuous political and cultural ties to the imperial court and its proxies, the Kamakura shogunate and Ashikaga shogunate. Feudal strongmen sometimes defined their own roles within the medieval institutional order, taking shogunate titles, while in other times they assumed titles that seemed to give them a non-Japanese identity. Many of the feudal strongmen were descended from Emishi military leaders who had been assimilated into Japanese society.

The Matsumae clan were of Yamato descent like other ethnic Japanese people, whereas the Emishi of northern Honshu were a distinctive group related to the Ainu. The Emishi were conquered and integrated into the Japanese state dating as far back as the 8th century and as a result began to lose their distinctive culture and ethnicity as they became minorities. By the time the Matsumae clan ruled over the Ainu, most of the Emishi were ethnically mixed and physically closer to Japanese than they were to Ainu. From this, the "transformation" theory postulates that native Jomon peoples changed gradually with the infusion of Yayoi immigrants into the Tōhoku region of northern Honshu, in contrast to the "replacement" theory that posits the Jomon were replaced by the Yayoi.

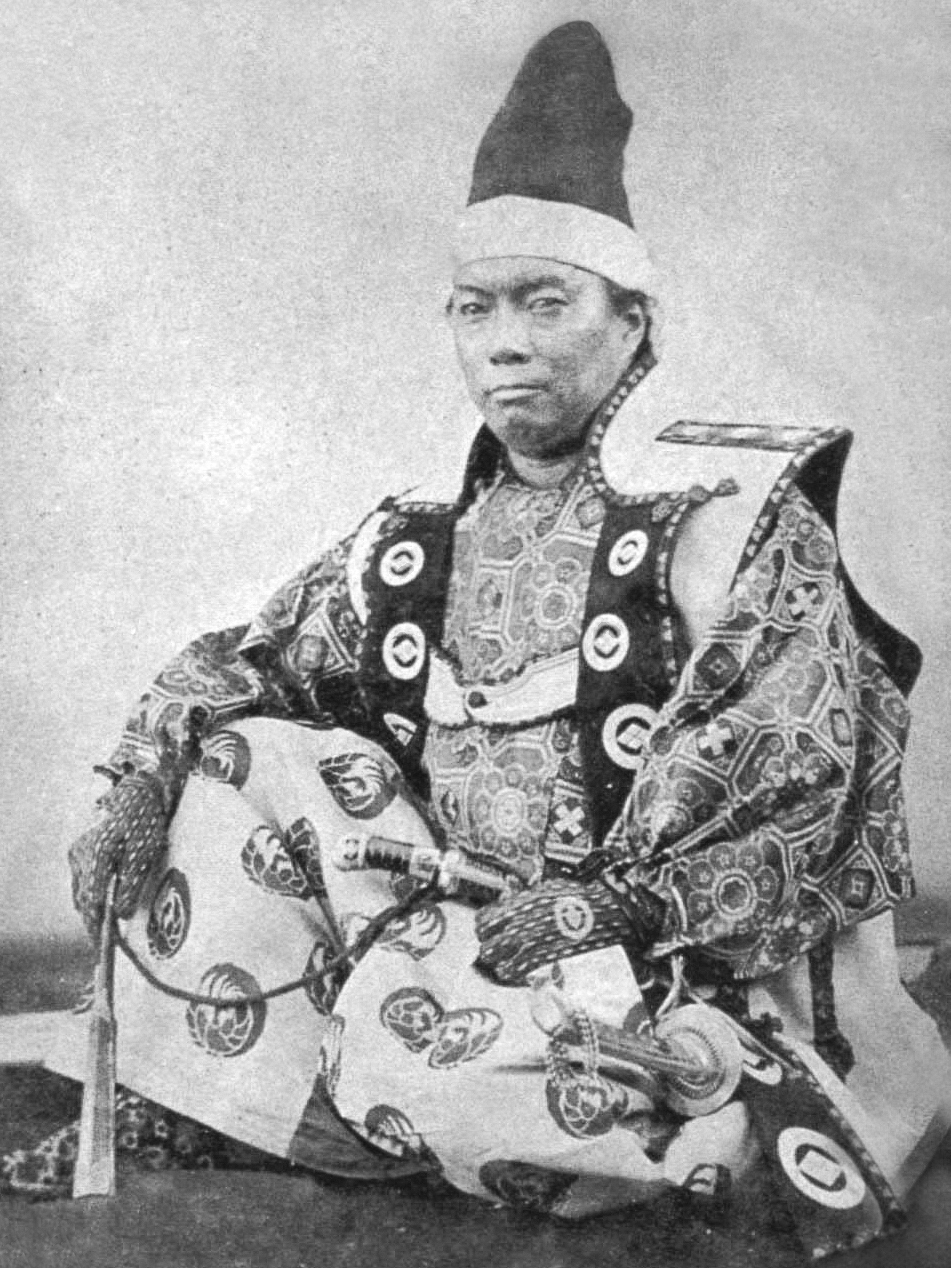
Matsumae Takahiro, a Matsumae lord of the late Edo period (December 10, 1829 – June 9, 1866)

There were numerous revolts by the Ainu against feudal rule. The last large-scale resistance was Shakushain's revolt in 1669–1672. In 1789, a smaller movement known as the Menashi–Kunashir rebellion was crushed, after which the terms "Japanese" and "Ainu" referred to clearly distinguished groups, and the Matsumae were unequivocally Japanese.

According to American professor of Japanese history John A. Harrison, prior to 1868 Japan used proximity as its claim to Hokkaido, Sakhalin, and the Kuril Islands. However, Japan had never thoroughly explored, governed, or exploited the areas, and this claim was invalidated by the movement of Russia into the Northeast Pacific area and by Russian settlements on Kamchatka (from 1699), Sakhalin (1850s) and the Sea of Okhotsk Coast (1640s onwards).

Prior to the Meiji Restoration of 1868, Hokkaido was seen as a frontier land and the Tokugawa shogunate realized the need to prepare northern defenses against a possible Russian invasion and took over control of most of Ezochi in 1855–1858. Many Japanese settlers regarded the Ainu as "inhuman and the inferior descendants of dogs". The Tokugawa irregularly imposed various assimilation programs on the Ainu due to the Tokugawa's perception of them as a threat from Russia. For example, assimilation programs were implemented in response to perceived threats from Russia, which included the Laxman expedition of 1793 and the Golovnin Incident of 1804. Once the respective Russian threats appeared to subside, the assimilation programs were halted until 1855. However, in 1855, once the Treaty of Shimoda was signed, which defined the borders between Russian Empire and Tokugawa Japan, the Tokugawa again viewed Russia as a threat to Japanese sovereignty over Hokkaido and reinstated assimilation programs on the Ainu.

=== Meiji era ===
==== Colonization of Hokkaido ====
Prior to the Meiji era, the island was called Ezochi, which can be translated as "land of the barbarians" or "the land for people who did not obey the government." Shortly after the Boshin War in 1868, a group of Tokugawa loyalists led by Enomoto Takeaki temporarily occupied the island (the polity is commonly but mistakenly known as the Republic of Ezo), but the rebellion was defeated in May 1869. Through colonial practices, Ezochi was annexed into Japanese territory. Ezochi was subsequently put under control of Hakodate Prefectural Government. When establishing the Development Commission (開拓使, Kaitakushi), the Meiji government introduced a new name, Hokkaido, which can be translated to "northern sea route". Regional subdivisions were established, including the provinces of Oshima, Shiribeshi, Iburi, Ishikari, Teshio, Kitami, Hidaka, Tokachi, Kushiro, Nemuro and Chishima.

Japanese proponents of Ezochi's colonization argued that it would serve as a strategic move to enhance Japan's standing and influence on the global stage, particularly in negotiations with Western powers, specifically Russia. The Meiji government invested heavily in colonizing Hokkaido for several reasons. Firstly, they aimed to assert their control over the region as a buffer against potential Russian advances. Secondly, they were attracted to Hokkaido's rich natural resources, including coal, timber, fish, and fertile land. Lastly, since Western powers viewed colonial expansion as a symbol of prestige, Japan viewed the colonization of Hokkaido as an opportunity to present itself as a modern and respected nation to Western powers.

The Goryōkaku fort in Hakodate

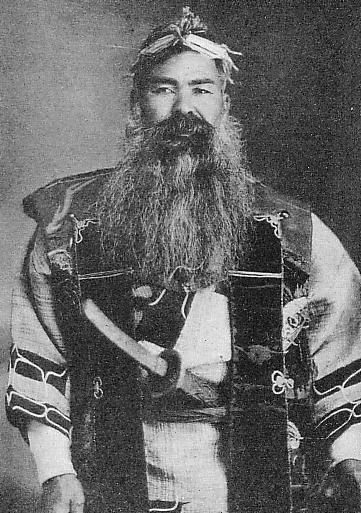
The Ainu, Hokkaido's indigenous people

The primary purpose of the Development Commission was to secure Hokkaido before the Russians extended their control of the Far East beyond Vladivostok. The Japanese failed to settle in the interior lowlands of the island because of aboriginal resistance. The resistance was eventually destroyed, and the lowlands were under the control of the commission. The most important goal of the Japanese was to increase the farm population and to create a conducive environment for emigration and settlement. However, the Japanese did not have expertise in modern agricultural techniques, and only possessed primitive mining and lumbering methods. Kuroda Kiyotaka was put in charge of the project, and turned to the United States for help.

His first step was to journey to the United States and recruit Horace Capron, US President Ulysses S. Grant's commissioner of agriculture. From 1871 to 1873, Capron bent his efforts to expounding Western agriculture and mining, with mixed results. Frustrated with obstacles to his efforts, Capron returned home in 1875. In 1876, William S. Clark arrived to establish an agricultural college in Sapporo. Although he only remained for a year, Clark left a lasting impression on Hokkaido, inspiring the Japanese with his teachings on agriculture as well as Christianity. His parting words, "Boys, be ambitious!", can be found on public buildings in Hokkaido to this day. The population of Hokkaido increased from 58,000 to 240,000 during that decade.

Kuroda hired Capron for US$10,000 per year and paid for all expenses related to the mission. Kuroda and his government were likely intrigued by Capron's previous colonial experience, particularly his involvement in the forced removal of Native Americans from Texas to new territories after the Mexican–American War. Capron introduced capital-intensive farming techniques by adopting American methods and tools, importing seeds for Western crops, and bringing in European livestock breeds, which included his favorite North Devon cattle. He founded experimental farms in Hokkaido, conducted surveys to assess mineral deposits and agricultural potential, and advocated for improvements in water access, mills, and roads.

The settler colonization of Hokkaido by the Japanese was organized and supported through collaboration between the Japanese state and American experts and technology. From the 1870s to the 1880s, Japanese leaders placed their efforts on settling Hokkaido by systematically migrating former samurai lords, samurai retainers, and common citizens, which included farmers and peasants, providing them with "free" land and financial assistance. This transformation was facilitated with the expertise of American advisors who introduced various colonization technologies, transforming Hokkaido into land suitable for Japan's capitalist aspirations.

Japanese leaders drew inspiration from American settler colonialism during their diplomatic visits to the United States. Japanese colonial officials learned settler colonial techniques from Western imperial powers, particularly the United States. This included declaring large portions of Hokkaido as ownerless land, providing a pretext for the dispossession of the Ainu people. Japan established the Hokkaido Colonization Board in 1869, a year after the start of the Meiji era, with the goal of encouraging Japanese settlers to Hokkaido. Mainland Japanese settlers began migrating to Hokkaido, leading to Japan's colonization of the island. Motivated by capitalist and industrial goals, the Meiji government forcefully appropriated fertile land and mineral-rich regions throughout Hokkaido, without consideration for their historical Ainu inhabitancy. The Meiji government implemented land seizures and enacted land ownership laws that favored Japanese settlers, effectively stripping Ainu people of their customary land rights and traditional means of subsistence. The 1899 Hokkaido Former Aborigines Protection Act further marginalized and impoverished the Ainu people by forcing them to leave their traditional lands and relocating them to the rugged, mountainous regions in the center of the island. The act prohibited the Ainu from fishing and hunting, which were their main source of subsistence. The Ainu were valued primarily as a source of inexpensive manual labor, and discriminatory assimilation policies further entrenched their sense of inferiority as well as worsened poverty and disease within Ainu communities. These policies exacerbated diasporic trends among the Ainu population, as many sought employment with the government or private enterprises, often earning meager wages that barely sustained their families.

The Meiji government embarked on assimilation campaigns aimed not only at assimilating the Ainu but also eradicating their language and culture entirely. They were forced to take on Japanese names and language, and gradually saw their culture and traditions eroded. The Ainu were forbidden to speak their own language and taught only Japanese at school. Facing pervasive stigma, many Ainu concealed their heritage. UNESCO has recognized the Ainu language as critically endangered. Given the Meiji state's full political control over the island, the subsequent subjugation of its indigenous inhabitants, aggressive economic exploitation, and ambitious permanent settlement endeavors, Hokkaido emerged as the sole successful settler colony of Japan.

After the Meiji colonisation of Hokkaido, Meiji Japan depended on prison labour to accelerate the colonisation process. The Japanese built three prisons and rendered Hokkaido a prison island, where political prisoners were incarcerated and used as prison labour. During the opening ceremony of the first prison, the Ainu name "Shibetsuputo" was replaced with the Japanese name "Tsukigata", as an attempt to "Japanise" Hokkaido's geography. The second prison opened near the Hokutan Horonai coal mine, where Ainu people were forced to work. Cheap prison labour played an important role in coal and sulphur mining, as well as road construction in Hokkaido. Eventually, several types of indentured labour, such as Takobeya labour, Korean labour, child labour and labour from women replaced the convict labour in Hokkaido. Working conditions were difficult and dangerous. Japan's transition to capitalism depended heavily on the growth of the coal mining sector in Hokkaido, with its importance increasing throughout World War I, and the mines requiring larger and larger amounts of labourers.

=== World War II ===
In mid-July 1945, various shipping ports, cities, and military facilities in Hokkaido were attacked by the United States Navy's Task Force 38. On 14–15 July, aircraft operating from the task force's aircraft carriers sank and damaged a large number of ships in ports along Hokkaido's southern coastline as well as in northern Honshu. In addition, on 15 July a force of three battleships and two light cruisers bombarded the city of Muroran. Before the Japanese surrender was formalized, the Soviet Union made preparations for an invasion of Hokkaido, but US President Harry Truman made it clear that the surrender of all of the Japanese home islands would be accepted by US General Douglas MacArthur per the 1943 Cairo Declaration.

=== Present ===
Hokkaido became equal with other prefectures in 1947, when the revised Local Autonomy Act became effective. The Japanese central government established the Hokkaido Development Agency (北海道開発庁, Hokkaidō Kaihatsuchō) as an agency of the Prime Minister's Office in 1949 to maintain its executive power in Hokkaido. The agency was absorbed by the Ministry of Land, Infrastructure and Transport in 2001. The Hokkaido Bureau (北海道局, Hokkaidō-kyoku) and the Hokkaidō Regional Development Bureau (北海道開発局, Hokkaidō Kaihatsukyoku) of the ministry still have a strong influence on public construction projects in Hokkaido.

== Geography ==
Hokkaidō
Native name: 北海道
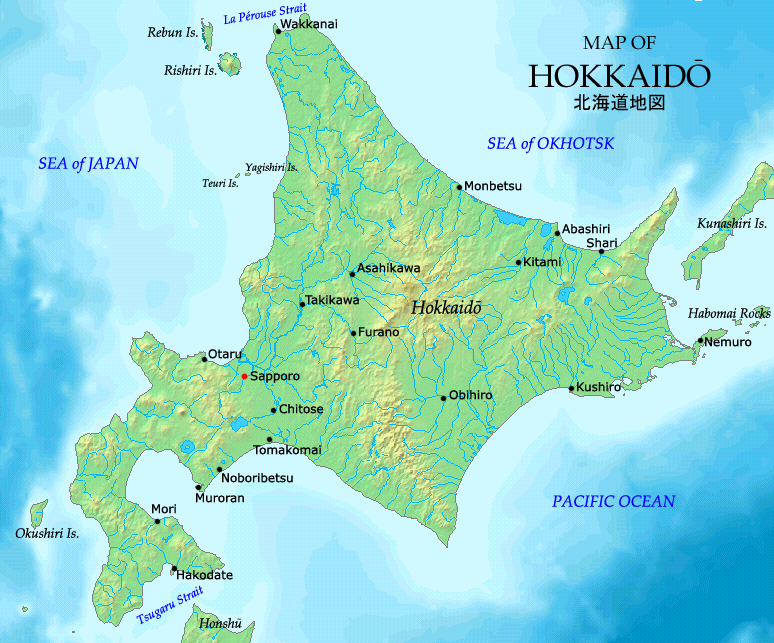
- Interactive map of Hokkaidō

Geography
- Location: East Asia
- Coordinates: 43°N 142°E
- Archipelago: Japanese archipelago
- Area: 83,423.84 km^{2} (32,210.12 sq mi)
- Highest elevation: 2,290 m (7510 ft)
- Highest point: Mount Asahi

Administration
- Japan
- Prefectures: Hokkaidō
- Largest settlement: Sapporo (pop. 1,890,561)

Demographics
- Population: 4,985,419 (1 October 2025)
- Pop. density: 59.8/km^{2} (154.9/sq mi)
- Ethnic groups: Ainu; Japanese

The island of Hokkaido is located in the north of Japan, near Russia (Sakhalin Oblast). It has coastlines on the Sea of Japan (to the west of the island), the Sea of Okhotsk (to the north), and the Pacific Ocean (to the east). The center of the island is mountainous, with volcanic plateaux. Hokkaido has multiple plains such as the Ishikari Plain 3,800 km^{2} (1,500 mi^{2}), Tokachi Plain 3,600 km^{2} (1,400 mi^{2}), the Kushiro Plain 2,510 km^{2} (970 mi^{2}) (the largest wetland in Japan) and Sarobetsu Plain 200 km^{2} (77 mi^{2}). Hokkaido is 83,423.84 km^{2} (32,210.12 mi^{2}) which make it the second-largest island of Japan.

The Tsugaru Strait separates Hokkaido from Honshu (Aomori Prefecture); La Pérouse Strait separates Hokkaido from the island of Sakhalin in Russia; Nemuro Strait separates Hokkaido from Kunashir Island in the Russian Kuril Islands.

The governmental jurisdiction of Hokkaido incorporates several smaller islands, including Rishiri, Okushiri Island, and Rebun. By Japanese reckoning, Hokkaido also incorporates the four southernmost Kuril Islands. Hokkaido is the largest and northernmost Japanese prefecture. The island ranks 21st in the world by area.

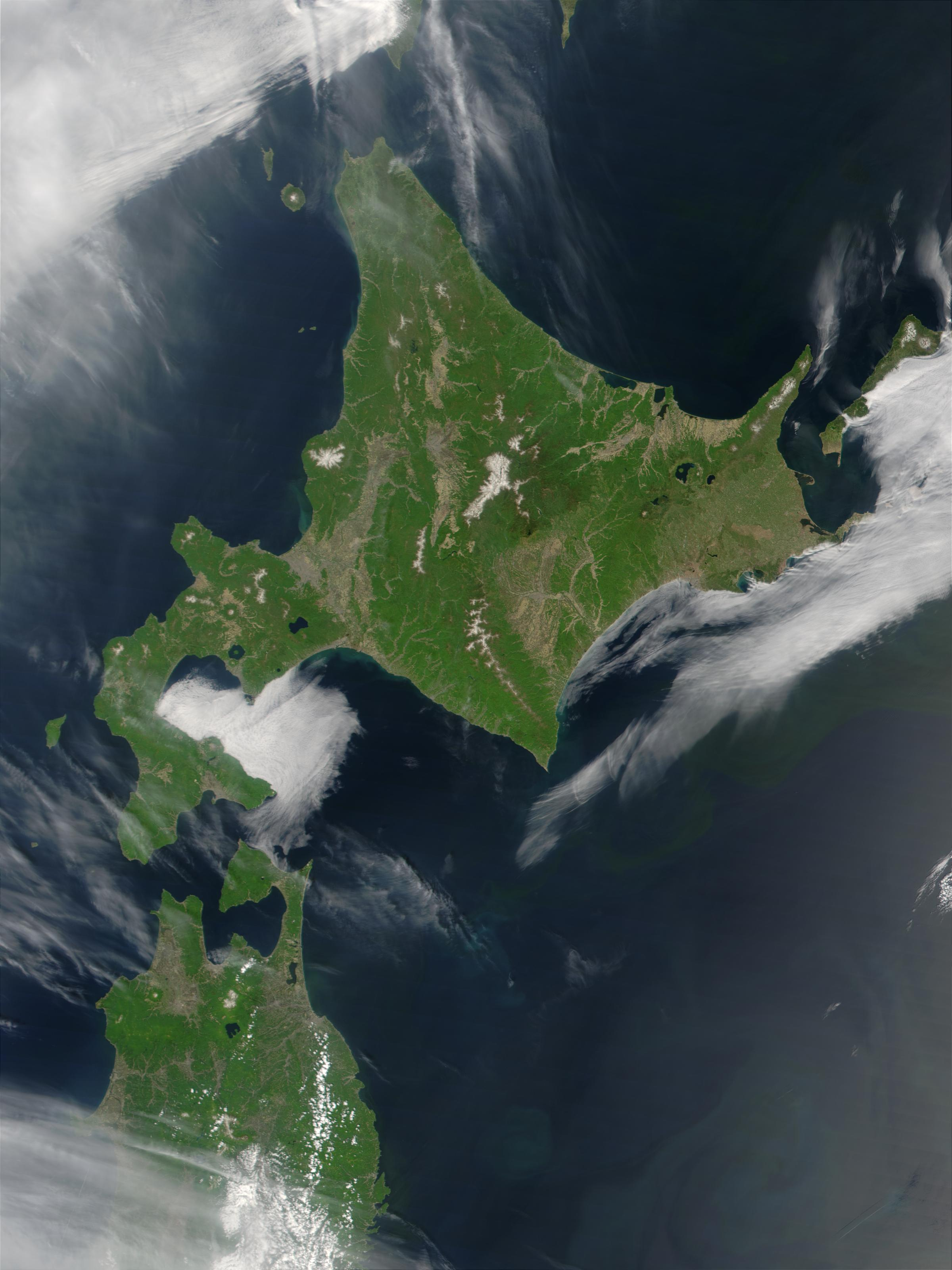
A satellite image of Hokkaido by Terra, May 2001

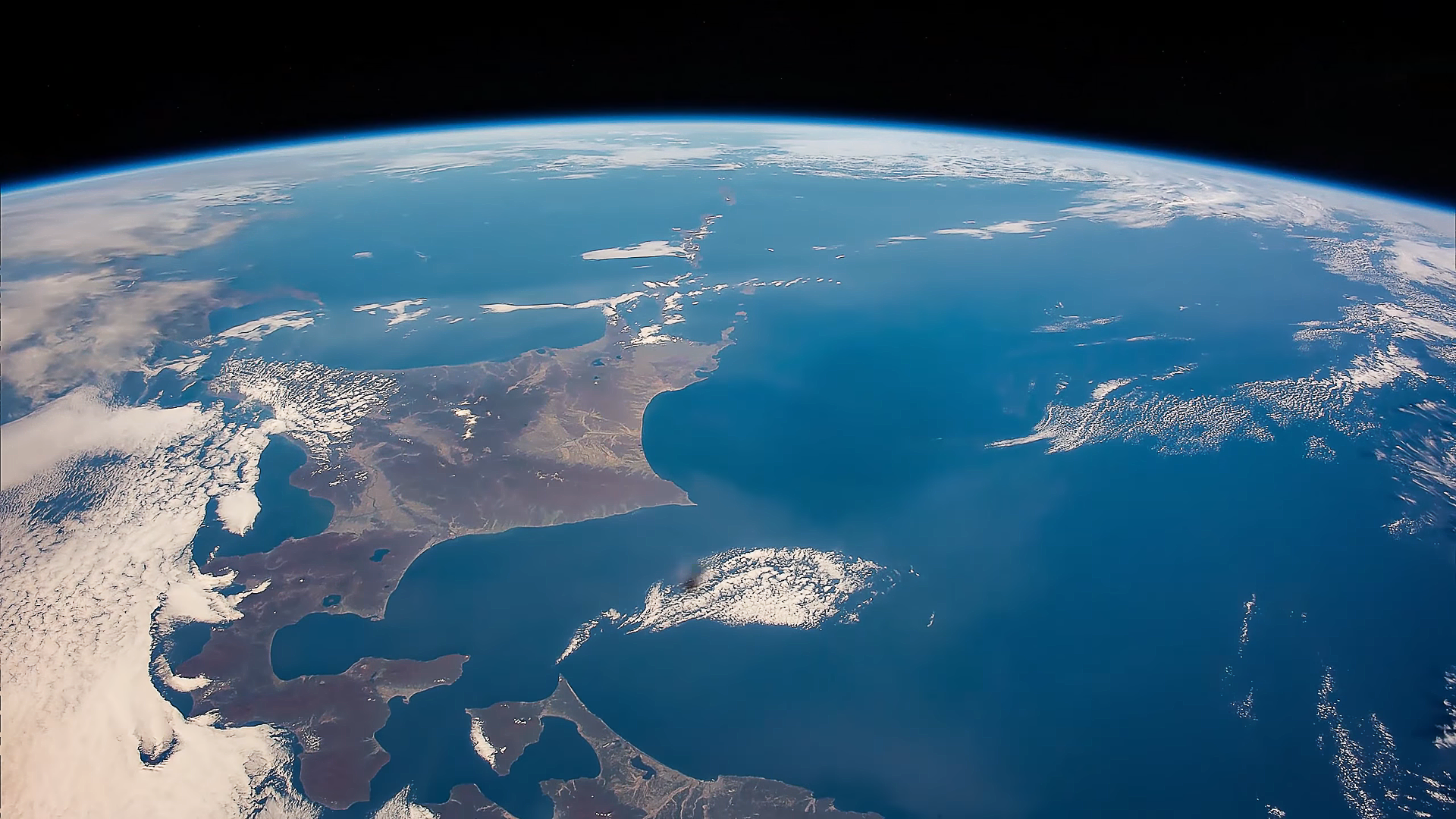
Hokkaido seen from the International Space Station

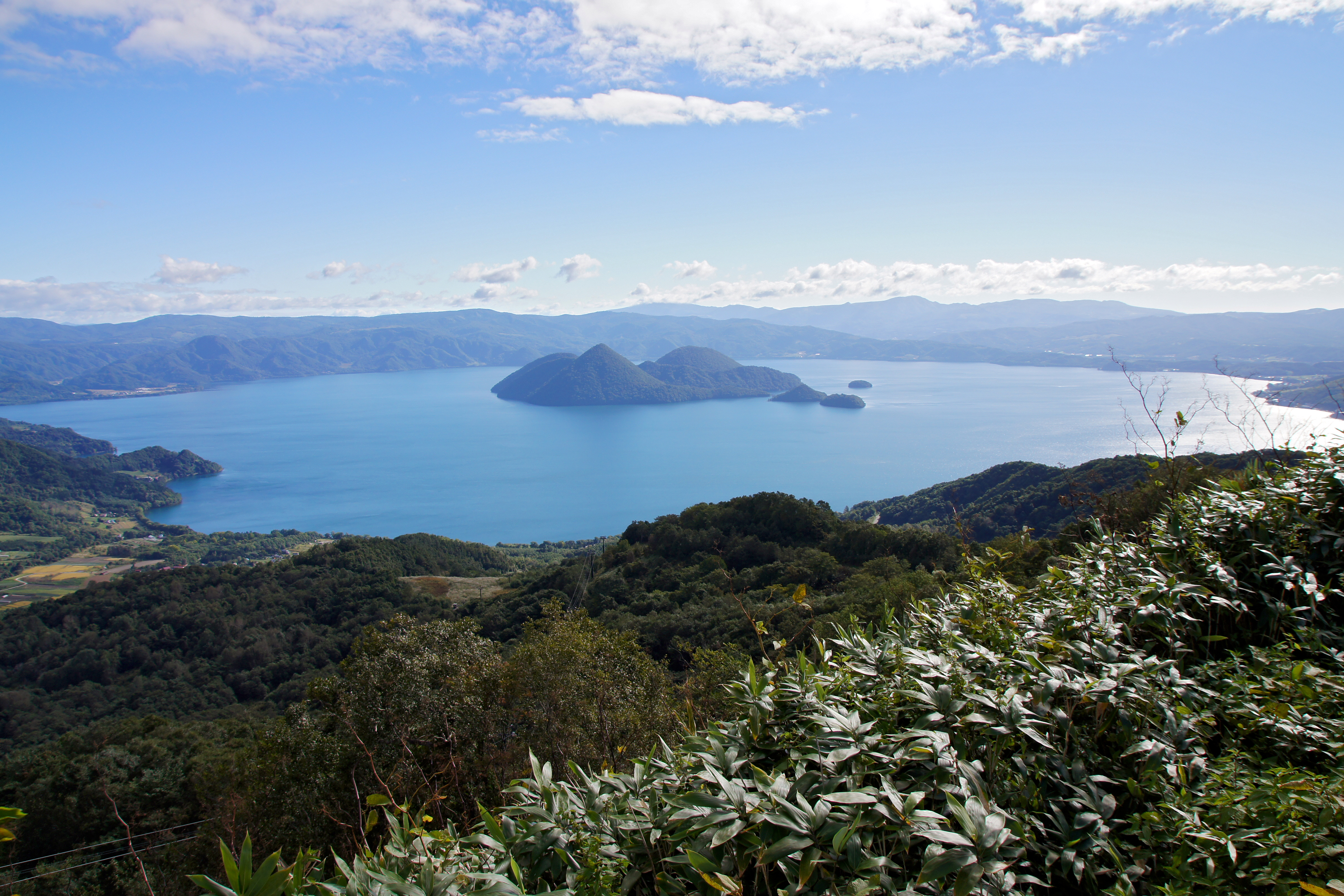
Lake Tōya, a volcanic caldera lake

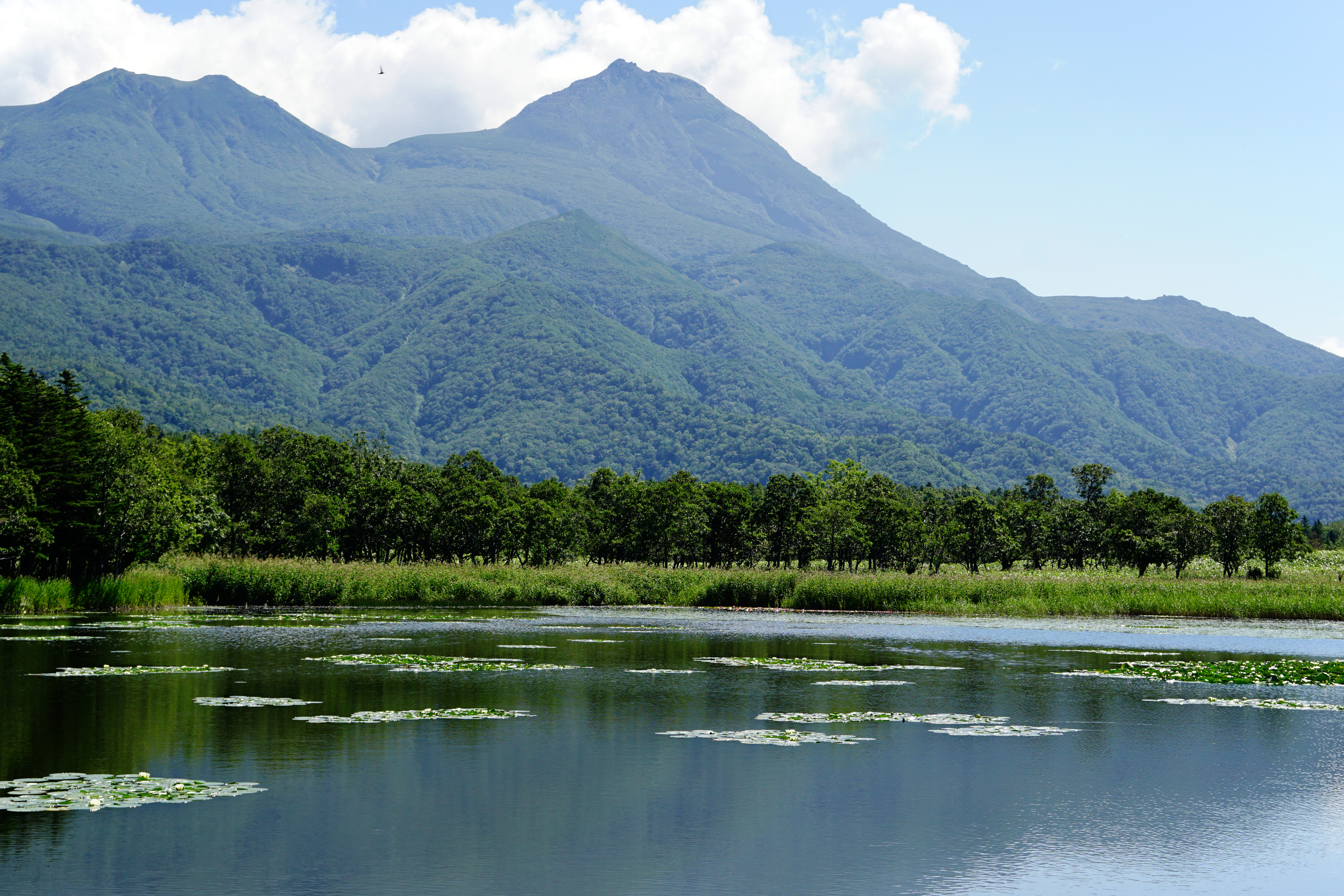
Shiretoko Goko Lakes in the town of Shari, Okhotsk Subprefecture, Hokkaido

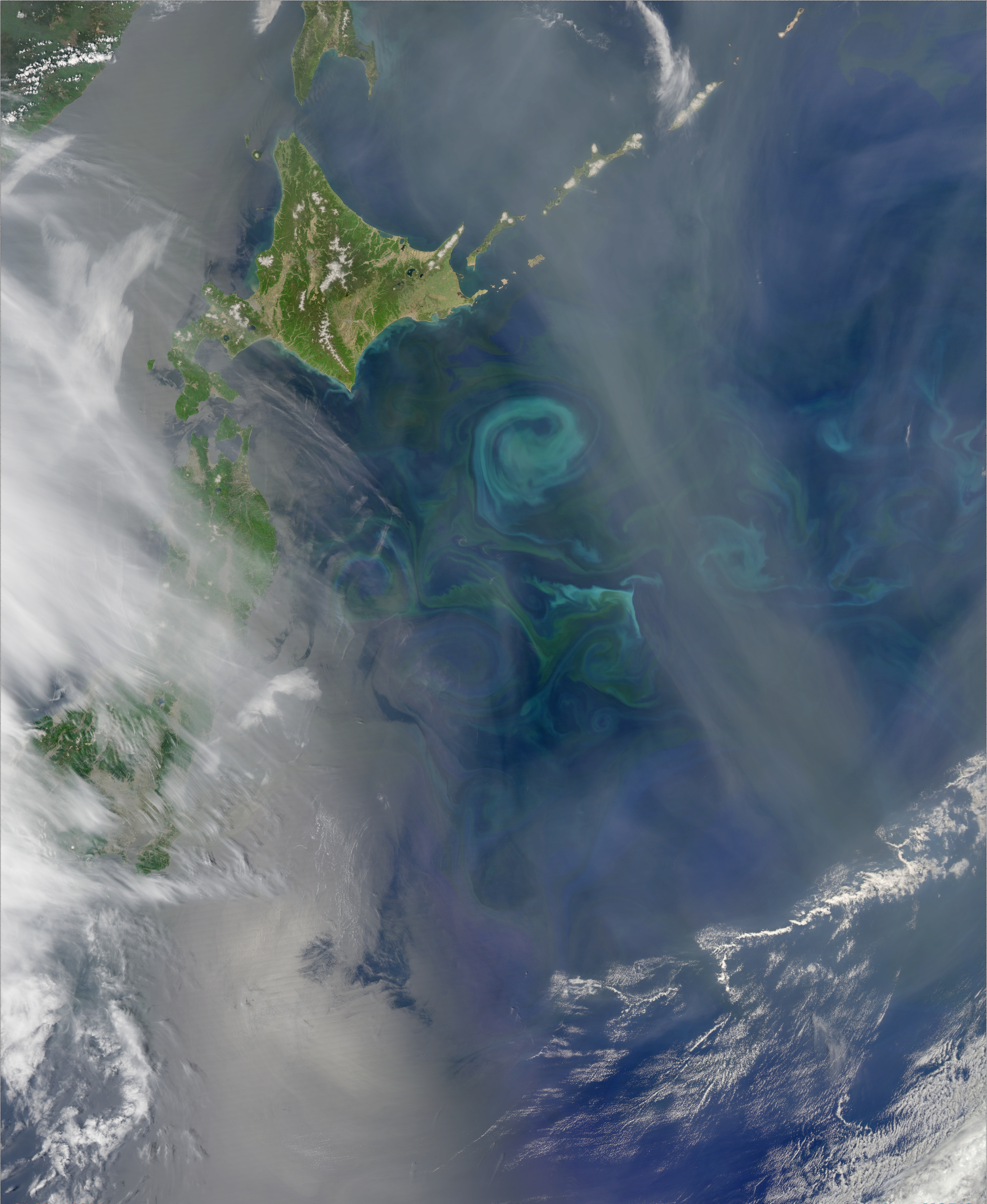
The Oyashio Current colliding with the Kuroshio Current off the coast of Hokkaido

=== Flora and fauna ===
There are three populations of the Ussuri brown bear found on the island. There are more brown bears in Hokkaido than anywhere else in Asia besides Russia. The Hokkaido brown bear is separated into three distinct lineages. There are only eight lineages in the world. Those on Honshu died out long ago.

Hokkaido is also the historical and current range of Japan's sea otter population, which is increasingly becoming a major tourism draw as sea otters disappear from Japanese aquaria.

The native conifer species in northern Hokkaido is the Sakhalin fir (Abies sachalinensis). The flowering plant Hydrangea hirta is also found on the island.

Notable flora and fauna
Name	Type	Notes
Ussuri brown bear	Fauna	One of the largest populations by average size of brown bears (Ursus arctos lasiotus)
Sea otter	Fauna	Heaviest species of mustelid (Enhydra lutris)
Steller's sea eagle	Fauna	On average, the heaviest eagle species in the world (Haliaeetus pelagicus)
Hokkaido wolf	Fauna	Extinct subspecies of the gray wolf (Canis lupus hattai).
Yezo sika deer	Fauna	Large subspecies of the sika deer (Cervus nippon yesoensis)
Ezoris	Fauna	Also called the Ezo squirrel (Sciurus vulgaris orientis)
Ezo red fox	Fauna	Native to northern Japanese archipelago (Vulpes vulpes schrencki)
Ezo tanuki	Fauna	Subspecies of raccoon dog native to Hokkaido (Nyctereutes viverrinus albus)
Hokkaido dog	Fauna	A Spitz-type domesticated hunting dog perhaps descend from introduced Akitas
Dosanko	Fauna	Also called the "Hokkaido horse"
Sable	Fauna	(Martes zibellina) A species of marten which inhabits Hokkaido and Northern Asia.
Viviparous lizard	Fauna	(Zootoca vivipara)
Ezo salamander	Fauna	(Hynobius retardatus)
Dolly Varden trout	Fauna	(Salvelinus malma)
Japanese emperor	Fauna	National butterfly of Japan (ō-murasaki, "great purple")
Grey Heron	Fauna	(Ardea cinerea) Long legged wading bird.
Chum salmon	Fauna	(white salmon (白鮭 シロサケ) is native to middle and northern Honshu, Hokkaido and the North Pacific.
Sockeye salmon	Fauna	(Oncorhynchus nerka, ベニザケ - Benizake) live in Hokkaido and the North Pacific.
Ezo spruce	Flora	Picea jezoensis
Sakhalin spruce	Flora	Picea glehnii
Japanese rose	Flora	Rosa rugosa

=== Geologic activity ===
Like many areas of Japan, Hokkaido is seismically active. Aside from numerous earthquakes, the following volcanoes are considered still active (at least one eruption since 1850):

- Hokkaido Koma-ga-take
- Mount Meakan
- Mount Tarumae
- Mount Tokachi
- Mount Usu and Shōwa-shinzan

In 1993, an earthquake of magnitude 7.7 generated a tsunami which devastated Okushiri, killing 202 inhabitants. An earthquake of magnitude 8.3 struck near the island on September 26, 2003. On September 6, 2018, an earthquake of magnitude 6.6 struck with its epicenter near the city of Tomakomai, causing a blackout across the whole island. On May 16, 2021, an earthquake measuring 6.1 on the Richter scale struck off the coast of Hokkaido.

=== Parks ===
National parks (国立公園)
Shiretoko National Park*	知床
Akan Mashu National Park	阿寒
Kushiro-shitsugen National Park	釧路湿原
Daisetsuzan National Park	大雪山
Shikotsu-Tōya National Park	支笏洞爺
Rishiri-Rebun-Sarobetsu National Park	利尻礼文サロベツ
Hidakasanmyaku-Erimo-Tokachi National Park	日高山脈襟裳十勝

* designated a World Heritage Site by UNESCO on 2005-07-14.

Quasi-national parks (国定公園)
Abashiri Quasi-National Park	網走
Niseko-Shakotan-Otaru Kaigan Quasi-National Park	ニセコ積丹小樽海岸
Ōnuma Quasi-National Park	大沼
Shokanbetsu-Teuri-Yagishiri Quasi-National Park	暑寒別天売焼尻

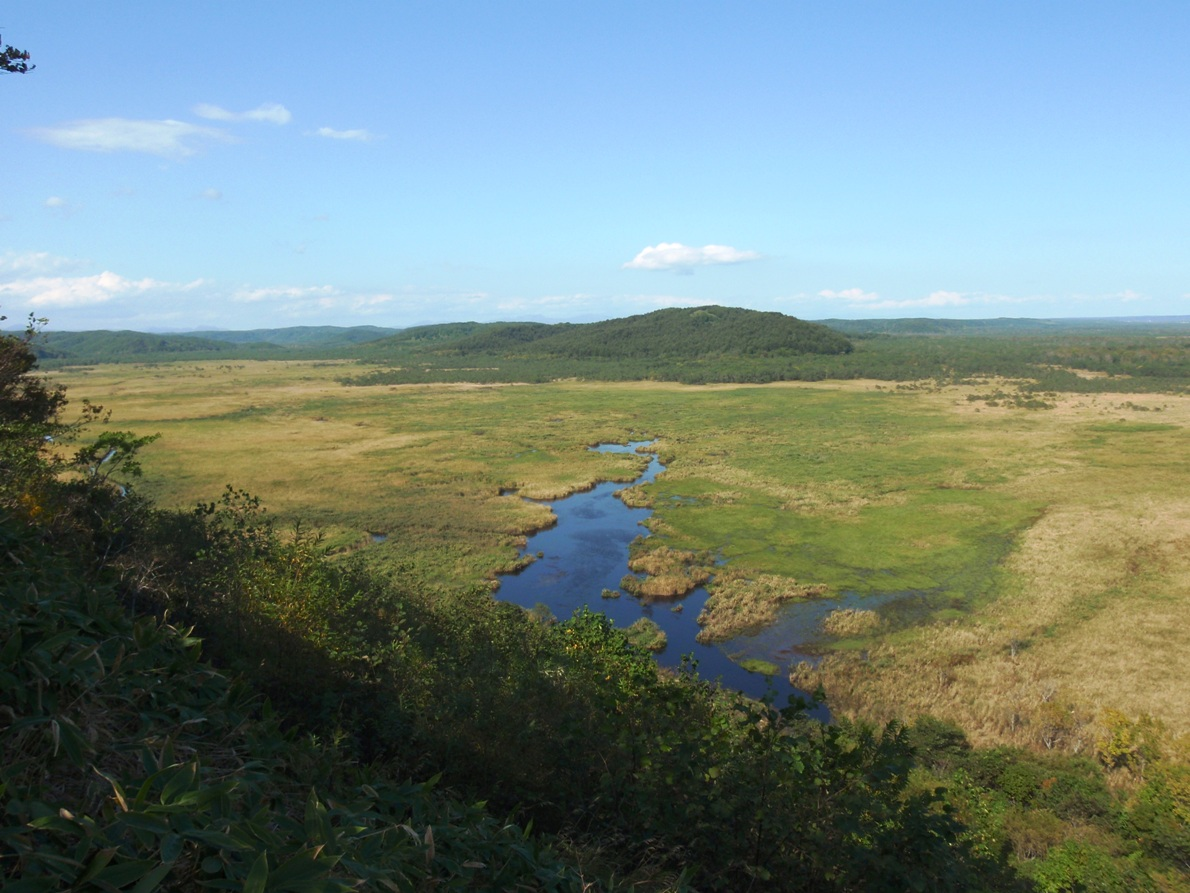
Overview of Kushiro Wetland

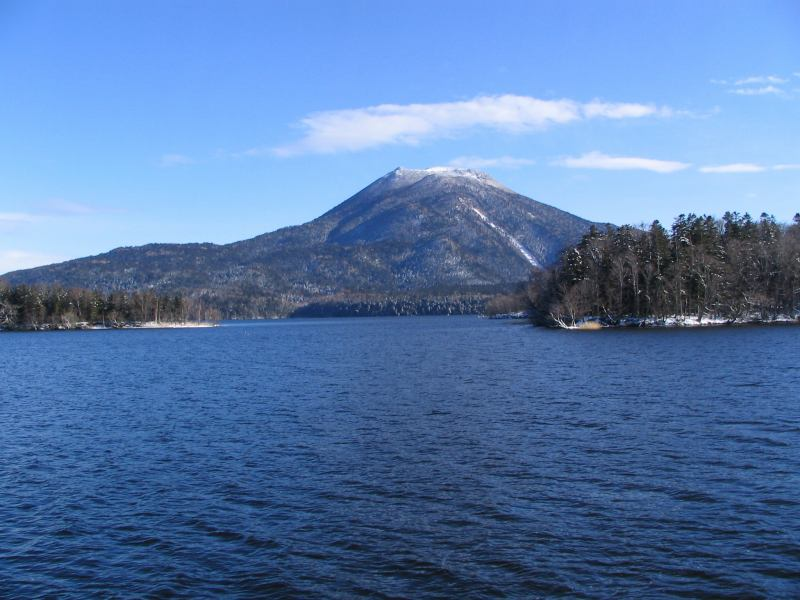
Lake Akan and Mount Meakan

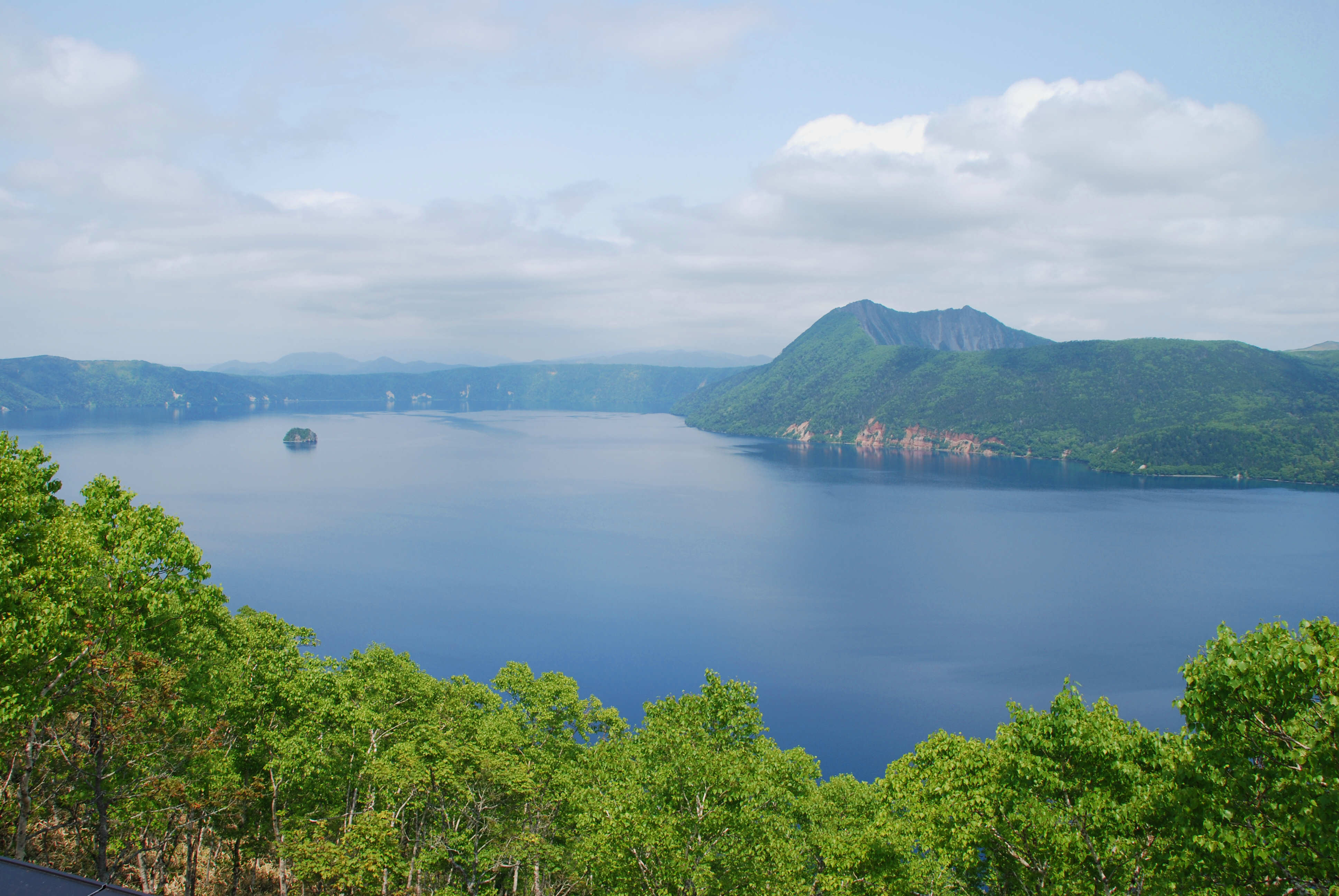
View of Lake Mashū

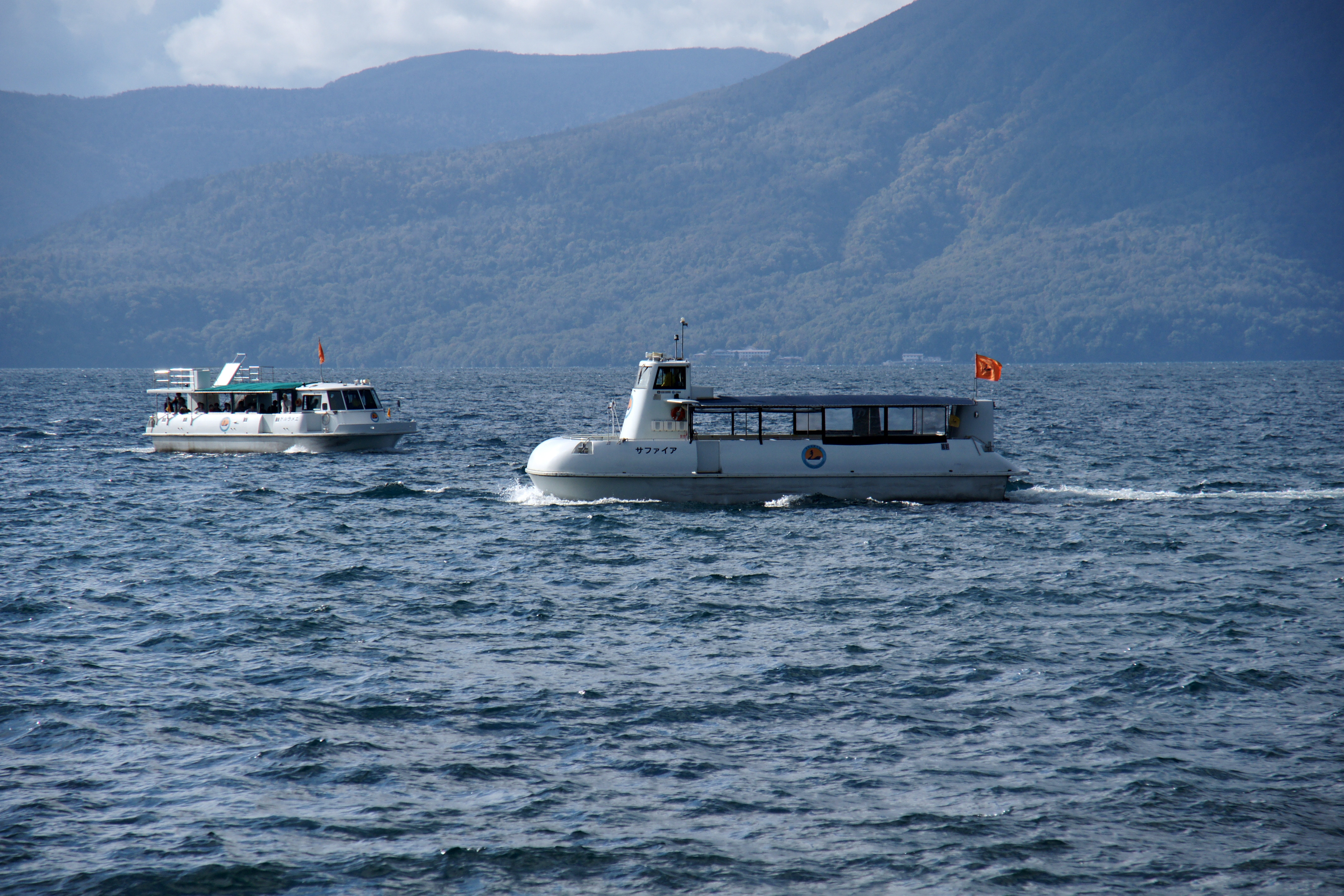
Lake Shikotsu

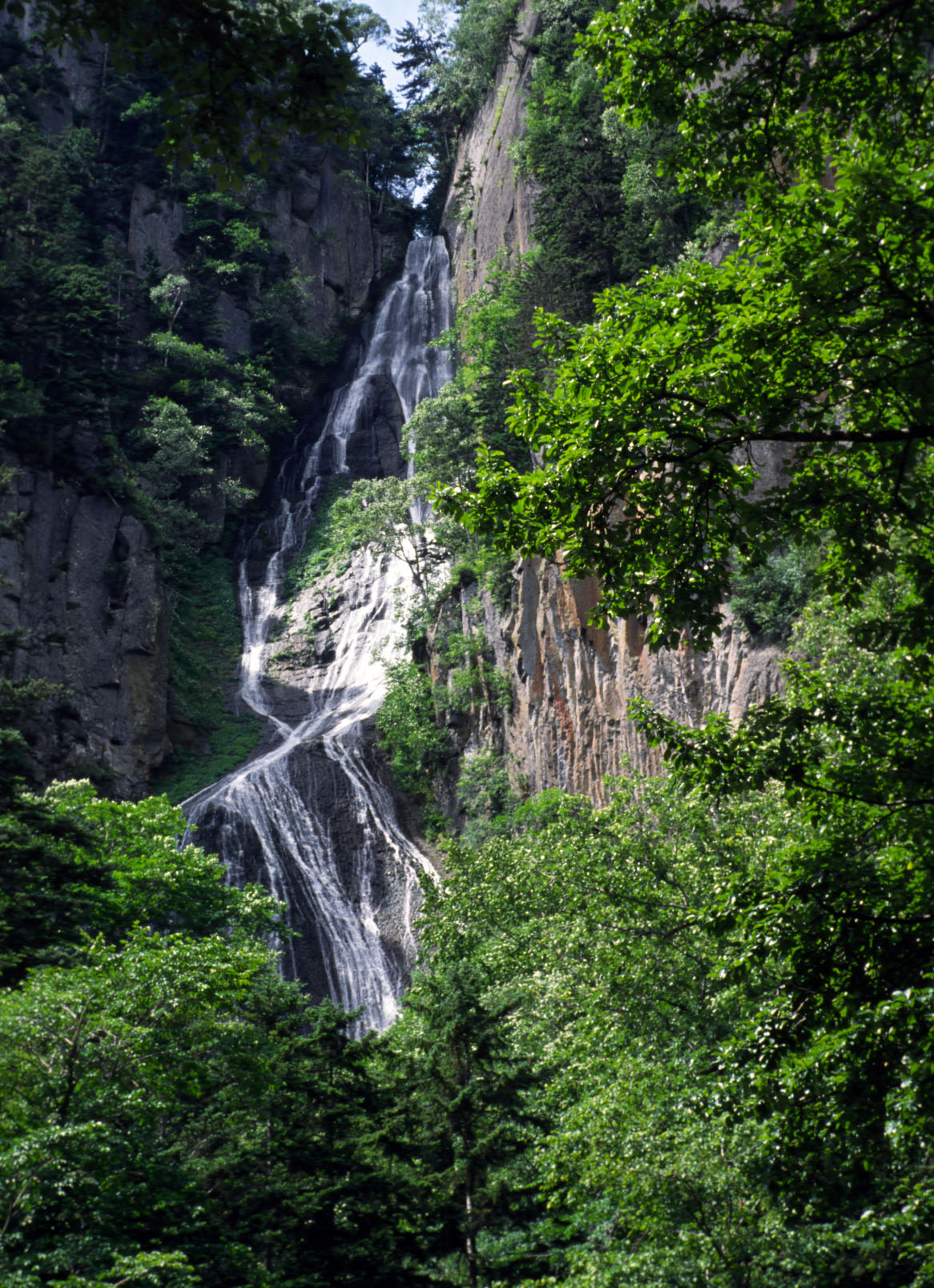
Sōunkyō, a gorge in the Daisetsu-zan Volcanic Area
- Twelve prefectural natural parks (道立自然公園). The prefectural natural parks cover 146,802 ha, the largest area of any prefecture.
  - Akkeshi Prefectural Natural Park
  - Esan Prefectural Natural Park
  - Furano-Ashibetsu Prefectural Natural Park
  - Hiyama Prefectural Natural Park
  - Kariba-Motta Prefectural Natural Park
  - Matsumae-Yagoshi Prefectural Natural Park
  - North Okhotsk Prefectural Natural Park
  - Nopporo Shinrin Kōen Prefectural Natural Park
  - Notsuke-Fūren Prefectural Natural Park
  - Sharidake Prefectural Natural Park
  - Shumarinai Prefectural Natural Park
  - Teshiodake Prefectural Natural Park

Ramsar wetland sites
		since
Kushiro Wetland	釧路湿原	1980-06-17
Lake Kutcharo	クッチャロ湖	1989-07-06
Lake Utonai	ウトナイ湖	1991-12-12
Kiritappu Wetland	霧多布湿原	1993-06-10
Lake Akkeshi, Bekkanbeushi Wetland	厚岸湖・別寒辺牛湿原	1993-06-10, enlarged 2005-11-08
Miyajima Marsh	宮島沼	2002-11-18
Uryūnuma Wetland	雨竜沼湿原	2005-11-08
Sarobetsu plain	サロベツ原野	2005-11-08
Lake Tōfutsu	濤沸湖	2005-11-08
Lake Akan	阿寒湖	2005-11-08
Notsuke Peninsula, Notsuke Bay	野付半島・野付湾	2005-11-08
Lake Fūren, Shunkunitai	風蓮湖・春国岱	2005-11-08

=== Climate ===
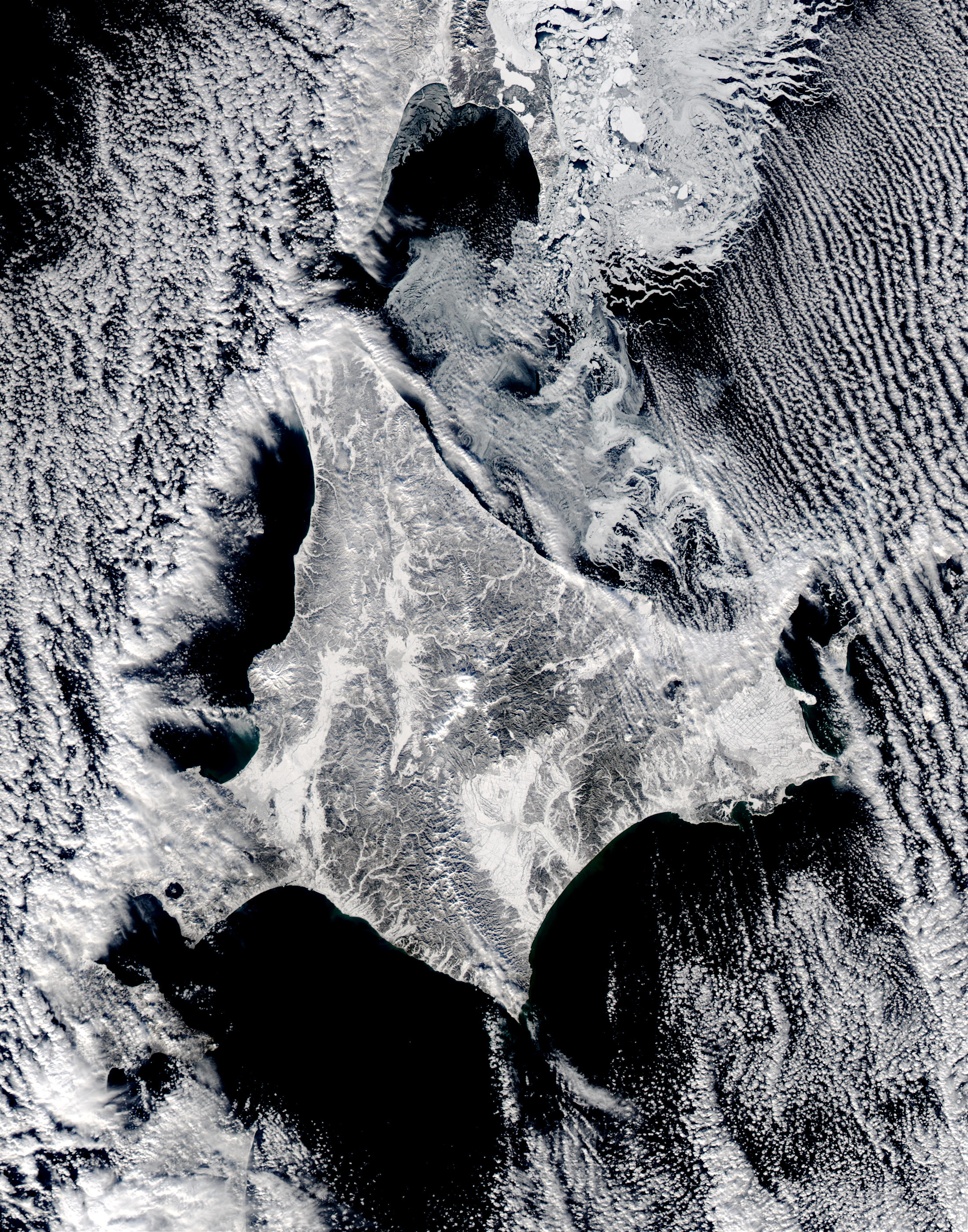
Satellite image of Hokkaido in winter, January 2003

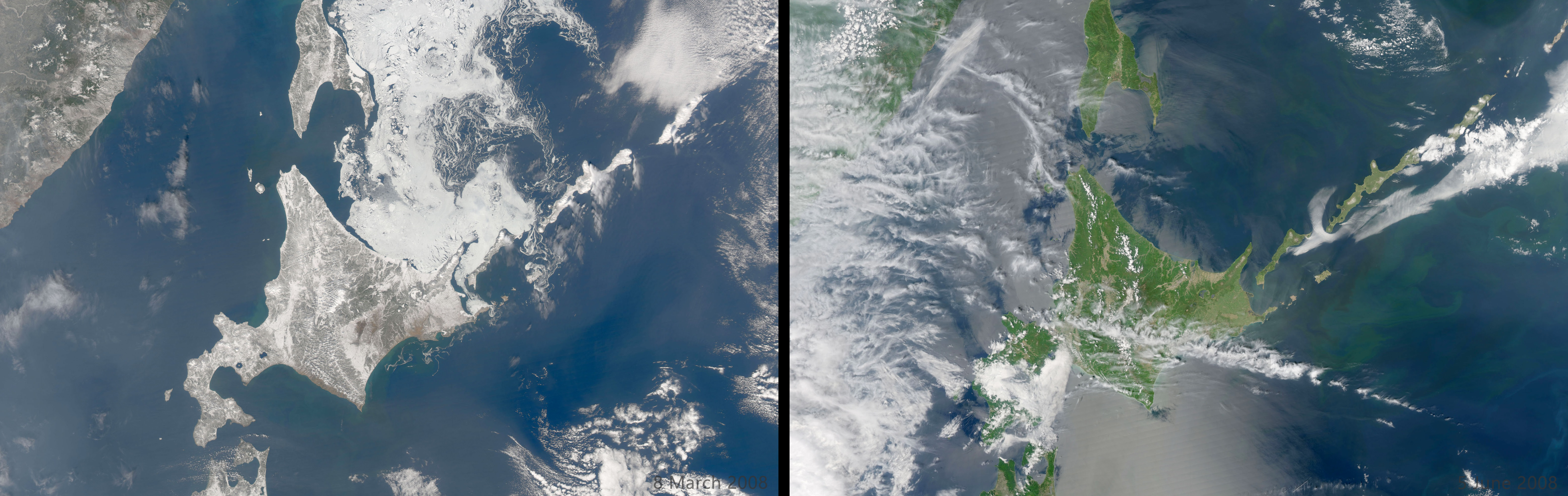
Hokkaido in winter and summer

As Japan's coldest region, Hokkaido has relatively cool summers and icy/snowy winters. Most of the island falls in the humid continental climate zone with Köppen climate classification Dfb (hemiboreal) in most areas but Dfa (hot summer humid continental) in some inland lowlands. The average August temperature ranges from 17 to 22 °C (62.6 to 71.6 °F), while the average January temperature ranges from −12 to −4 °C (10.4 to 24.8 °F), in both cases depending on elevation and distance from the ocean, though temperatures on the western side of the island tend to be a little warmer than on the eastern. The highest temperature ever recorded is 39.5 °C (103.1 °F) on 26 May 2019.

The northern portion of Hokkaido falls into the taiga biome with significant snowfall. Snowfall varies widely from as much as 11 metres (400 in) on the mountains adjacent to the Sea of Japan down to around 1.8 metres (71 in) on the Pacific coast. The island tends to have isolated snowstorms that develop long-lasting snowbanks. Total precipitation varies from 1,600 millimetres (63 in) on the mountains of the Sea of Japan coast to around 800 millimetres (31 in) (the lowest in Japan) on the Sea of Okhotsk coast and interior lowlands and up to around 1,100 millimetres (43 in) on the Pacific side. The generally high quality of powder snow and numerous mountains in Hokkaido make it a popular region for snow sports. The snowfall usually commences in earnest in November and ski resorts (such as those at Niseko, Furano, Teine and Rusutsu) usually operate between December and April. Hokkaido celebrates its winter weather at the Sapporo Snow Festival.

Hokkaido’s winter snowfall is driven by a seasonal atmospheric pattern between Siberia and the North Pacific. During winter, the Eurasian continent receives limited solar energy and cools rapidly, forming a strong and persistent high-pressure system over Siberia known as the Siberian High. At the same time, the North Pacific retains heat longer and forms a persistent low-pressure system called the Aleutian Low. The resulting pressure difference generates steady northwesterly winds that carry very cold, dry air toward Japan. As this air crosses the Sea of Japan, it passes over the Tsushima Warm Current, which keeps coastal waters relatively warm and enables significant moisture uptake. When the moisture-laden air reaches Hokkaido’s mountainous coastline, it is forced upward, condenses, and produces significant snowfall. This is an effect often referred to as ocean-effect snowfall. Despite the common assumption that La Niña brings heavier snow, long-term observations show no consistent correlation between La Niña phases and increased snowfall in Hokkaido.

During the winter, passage through the Sea of Okhotsk is often complicated by large floes of drift ice. Combined with high winds that occur during winter, this frequently brings air travel and maritime activity to a halt beyond the northern coast of Hokkaido. Ports on the open Pacific Ocean and Sea of Japan are generally ice-free year round, though most rivers freeze during the winter.

Unlike the other major islands of Japan, Hokkaido is normally not affected by the June–July rainy season and the relative lack of humidity and typically warm, rather than hot, summer weather makes its climate an attraction for tourists from other parts of Japan.

==== Temperature comparison ====
Monthly average highs and lows for various cities and towns in Hokkaido in Celsius and Fahrenheit
City	Jan	Feb	Mar	Apr	May	Jun	Jul	Aug	Sep	Oct	Nov	Dec
Sapporo	−0.4 / −6.4 (31.3 / 20.5)	0.4 / −6.2 (32.7 / 20.8)	4.5 / −2.4 (40.1 / 27.7)	11.7 / 3.4 (53.1 / 38.1)	17.9 / 9.0 (64.2 / 48.2)	21.8 / 13.4 (71.2 / 56.1)	25.4 / 17.9 (77.7 / 64.2)	26.4 / 19.1 (79.5 / 66.4)	22.8 / 14.8 (73.0 / 58.6)	16.4 / 8.0 (61.5 / 46.4)	8.7 / 1.6 (47.7 / 34.9)	2.0 / −4.0 (35.6 / 24.8)
Hakodate	0.9 / −6.0 (33.6 / 21.2)	1.8 / −5.7 (35.2 / 21.7)	5.8 / −2.2 (42.4 / 28.0)	12.0 / 2.8 (53.6 / 37.0)	17.0 / 8.0 (62.6 / 46.4)	20.4 / 12.6 (68.7 / 54.7)	24.1 / 17.3 (75.4 / 63.1)	25.9 / 18.9 (78.6 / 66.0)	23.2 / 14.6 (73.8 / 58.3)	17.1 / 7.8 (62.8 / 46.0)	10.0 / 1.8 (50.0 / 35.2)	3.2 / −3.6 (37.8 / 25.5)
Asahikawa	−3.3 / −11.7 (26.1 / 10.9)	−1.7 / −11.8 (28.9 / 10.8)	3.0 / −6.1 (37.4 / 21.0)	11.2 / 0.2 (52.2 / 32.4)	18.8 / 6.1 (65.8 / 43.0)	22.8 / 12.0 (73.0 / 53.6)	26.2 / 16.4 (79.2 / 61.5)	26.6 / 16.9 (79.9 / 62.4)	21.9 / 11.7 (71.4 / 53.1)	14.9 / 4.4 (58.8 / 39.9)	6.2 / −1.5 (43.2 / 29.3)	−0.8 / −8.0 (30.6 / 17.6)
Kushiro	−0.2 / −9.8 (31.6 / 14.4)	−0.1 / −9.4 (31.8 / 15.1)	3.3 / −4.2 (37.9 / 24.4)	8.0 / 0.7 (46.4 / 33.3)	12.6 / 5.4 (54.7 / 41.7)	15.8 / 9.5 (60.4 / 49.1)	19.6 / 13.6 (67.3 / 56.5)	21.5 / 15.7 (70.7 / 60.3)	20.1 / 12.9 (68.2 / 55.2)	15.1 / 6.1 (59.2 / 43.0)	8.9 / −0.3 (48.0 / 31.5)	2.5 / −7.0 (36.5 / 19.4)
Wakkanai	−2.4 / −6.4 (27.7 / 20.5)	−2.0 / −6.7 (28.4 / 19.9)	1.6 / −3.1 (34.9 / 26.4)	7.4 / 1.8 (45.3 / 35.2)	12.4 / 6.3 (54.3 / 43.3)	16.1 / 10.4 (61.0 / 50.7)	20.1 / 14.9 (68.2 / 58.8)	22.3 / 17.2 (72.1 / 63.0)	20.1 / 14.4 (68.2 / 57.9)	14.1 / 8.4 (57.4 / 47.1)	6.3 / 1.3 (43.3 / 34.3)	0.0 / −4.2 (32.0 / 24.4)
Rikubetsu	−2.5 / −19.6 (27.5 / −3.3)	−1.4 / −18.8 (29.5 / −1.8)	3.2 / −10.6 (37.8 / 12.9)	10.5 / −2.5 (50.9 / 27.5)	17.1 / 3.4 (62.8 / 38.1)	20.6 / 9.1 (69.1 / 48.4)	23.7 / 14.0 (74.7 / 57.2)	24.4 / 15.0 (75.9 / 59.0)	20.8 / 9.8 (69.4 / 49.6)	14.7 / 1.8 (58.5 / 35.2)	7.1 / −5.3 (44.8 / 22.5)	−0.2 / −14.9 (31.6 / 5.2)
Saroma	−2.6 / −15.6 (27.3 / 3.9)	−2.2 / −16.3 (28.0 / 2.7)	2.5 / −9.5 (36.5 / 14.9)	10.2 / −1.8 (50.4 / 28.8)	16.9 / 3.8 (62.4 / 38.8)	20.2 / 8.9 (68.4 / 48.0)	23.9 / 13.6 (75.0 / 56.5)	24.9 / 14.8 (76.8 / 58.6)	21.6 / 10.1 (70.9 / 50.2)	15.3 / 2.9 (59.5 / 37.2)	7.5 / −3.2 (45.5 / 26.2)	0.1 / −11.7 (32.2 / 10.9)
Okushiri	1.6 / −2.4 (34.9 / 27.7)	1.9 / −2.2 (35.4 / 28.0)	5.3 / 0.7 (41.5 / 33.3)	10.0 / 5.0 (50.0 / 41.0)	14.6 / 9.3 (58.3 / 48.7)	19.0 / 13.6 (66.2 / 56.5)	22.9 / 17.9 (73.2 / 64.2)	25.4 / 20.1 (77.7 / 68.2)	22.6 / 17.5 (72.7 / 63.5)	16.6 / 11.8 (61.9 / 53.2)	10.0 / 5.1 (50.0 / 41.2)	3.9 / −0.5 (39.0 / 31.1)
Erimo	0.2 / −4.0 (32.4 / 24.8)	−0.2 / −4.3 (31.6 / 24.3)	2.2 / −1.9 (36.0 / 28.6)	6.1 / 1.3 (43.0 / 34.3)	10.1 / 5.0 (50.2 / 41.0)	13.6 / 9.0 (56.5 / 48.2)	17.5 / 13.4 (63.5 / 56.1)	19.9 / 15.8 (67.8 / 60.4)	19.0 / 14.9 (66.2 / 58.8)	14.7 / 10.2 (58.5 / 50.4)	9.3 / 4.2 (48.7 / 39.6)	3.3 / −1.3 (37.9 / 29.7)

== Administrative divisions ==
=== Subprefectures ===
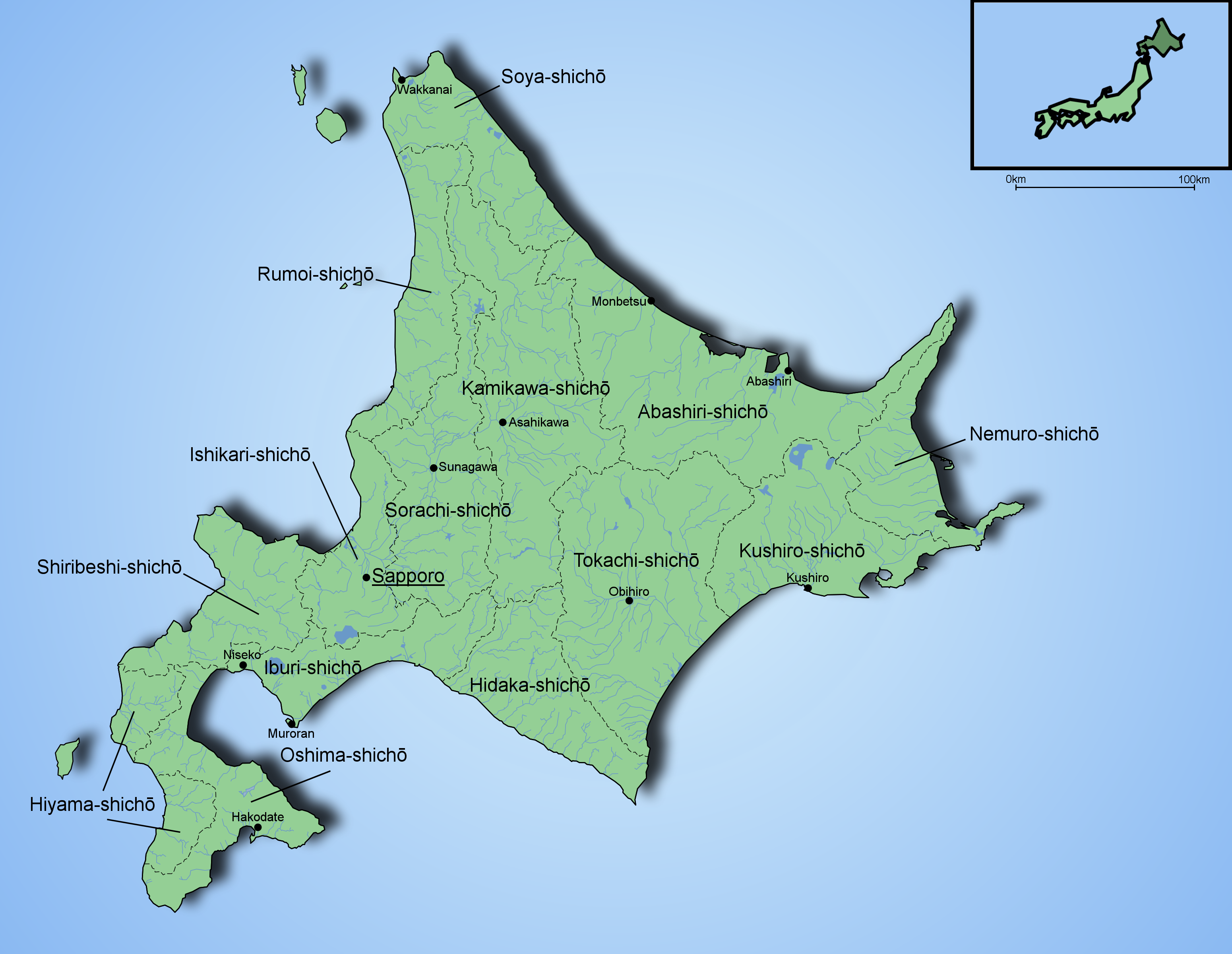
A map of Hokkaido showing the pre-2010 subprefectures and the primary cities

A map of Hokkaido within Japan, including the disputed Kuril islands

As of April 2010, Hokkaido has nine General Subprefectural Bureaus (総合振興局) and five Subprefectural Bureaus (振興局). Hokkaido is one of eight prefectures in Japan that have subprefectures (支庁 shichō). Hokkaido is the only one of the eight to have such offices covering the whole of its territory outside the main cities, rather than having them just for outlying islands or remote areas.

This is mostly because of its great size. Many parts of the prefecture are simply too far away to be effectively administered by Sapporo. Subprefectural offices in Hokkaido carry out many of the duties that prefectural offices fulfill elsewhere in Japan.

Subprefecture		Japanese	Main city	Largest municipality	Pop. (2009)	Area (km^{2})	Municipalities		
1	Sorachi	空知総合振興局	Iwamizawa	Iwamizawa	338,485	5,791.19	10 cities	14 towns	
a	↳ Ishikari	石狩振興局	Sapporo	Sapporo	2,324,878	3,539.86	6 cities	1 town	1 village
2	Shiribeshi	後志総合振興局	Kutchan	Otaru	234,984	4,305.83	1 city	13 towns	6 villages
3	Iburi	胆振総合振興局	Muroran	Tomakomai	419,115	3,698.00	4 cities	7 towns	
b	↳ Hidaka	日高振興局	Urakawa	Shinhidaka	76,084	4,811.97		7 towns	
4	Oshima	渡島総合振興局	Hakodate	Hakodate	433,475	3,936.46	2 cities	9 towns	
c	↳ Hiyama	檜山振興局	Esashi	Setana	43,210	2,629.94		7 towns	
5	Kamikawa	上川総合振興局	Asahikawa	Asahikawa	527,575	10,619.20	4 cities	17 towns	2 villages
d	↳ Rumoi	留萌振興局	Rumoi	Rumoi	53,916	3,445.75	1 city	6 towns	1 village
6	Sōya	宗谷総合振興局	Wakkanai	Wakkanai	71,423	4,625.09	1 city	8 towns	1 village
7	Okhotsk	オホーツク総合振興局	Abashiri	Kitami	309,487	10,690.62	3 cities	14 towns	1 village
8	Tokachi	十勝総合振興局	Obihiro	Obihiro	353,291	10,831.24	1 city	16 towns	2 villages
9	Kushiro	釧路総合振興局	Kushiro	Kushiro	252,571	5,997.38	1 city	6 towns	1 village
e	↳ Nemuro	根室振興局	Nemuro	Nemuro	84,035	3,406.23	1 city	4 towns	*
* Japan claims the southern part of Kuril Islands (Northern Territories), currently administered by Russia, belong to Nemuro Subprefecture divided into six villages. However, the table above excludes these islands' data.

=== Municipalities ===
Hokkaido is divided into 179 municipalities.

A map of Hokkaido by type of municipality Government Ordinance Designated City City Town Village

==== Cities ====
There are 35 cities in Hokkaido:

Name		Area (km^{2})	Population	Subprefecture	Map
Rōmaji	Kanji	Area (km^{2})	Population	Subprefecture	Map
Abashiri	網走市	470.94	34,919	Okhotsk Subprefecture	
Akabira	赤平市	129.88	10,686	Sorachi Subprefecture	
Asahikawa	旭川市	747.6	333,530	Kamikawa Subprefecture	
Ashibetsu	芦別市	865.02	14,260	Sorachi Subprefecture	
Bibai	美唄市	277.61	24,768	Sorachi Subprefecture	
Chitose	千歳市	594.5	96,475	Ishikari Subprefecture	
Date	伊達市	444.28	34,898	Iburi Subprefecture	
Ebetsu	江別市	187.57	119,086	Ishikari Subprefecture	
Eniwa	恵庭市	294.87	68,883	Ishikari Subprefecture	
Fukagawa	深川市	529.12	21,618	Sorachi Subprefecture	
Furano	富良野市	600.97	22,715	Kamikawa Subprefecture	
Hakodate	函館市	677.89	264,845	Oshima Subprefecture	
Hokuto	北斗市	397.29	46,083	Oshima Subprefecture	
Ishikari	石狩市	721.86	58,755	Ishikari Subprefecture	
Iwamizawa	岩見沢市	481.1	84,127	Sorachi Subprefecture	
Kitahiroshima	北広島市	118.54	58,918	Ishikari Subprefecture	
Kitami	北見市	1,427.56	119,135	Okhotsk Subprefecture	
Kushiro	釧路市	1,362.75	167,875	Kushiro Subprefecture	
Mikasa	三笠市	302.64	9,056	Sorachi Subprefecture	
Monbetsu	紋別市	830.7	22,983	Okhotsk Subprefecture	
Muroran	室蘭市	80.65	93,716	Iburi Subprefecture	
Nayoro	名寄市	535.23	28,373	Kamikawa Subprefecture	
Nemuro	根室市	512.63	27,109	Nemuro Subprefecture	
Noboribetsu	登別市	212.11	49,523	Iburi Subprefecture	
Obihiro	帯広市	618.94	165,851	Tokachi Subprefecture	
Otaru	小樽市	243.13	115,333	Shiribeshi Subprefecture	
Rumoi	留萌市	297.44	22,242	Rumoi Subprefecture	
Sapporo (capital)	札幌市	1,121.26	1,973,432	Ishikari Subprefecture	
Shibetsu	士別市	1,119.29	19,794	Kamikawa Subprefecture	
Sunagawa	砂川市	78.69	17,589	Sorachi Subprefecture	
Takikawa	滝川市	115.9	41,306	Sorachi Subprefecture	
Tomakomai	苫小牧市	561.49	174,216	Iburi Subprefecture	
Utashinai	歌志内市	55.99	3,019	Sorachi Subprefecture	
Wakkanai	稚内市	761.47	33,869	Sōya Subprefecture	
Yūbari	夕張市	763.2	8,612	Sorachi Subprefecture	

== Major cities and towns ==
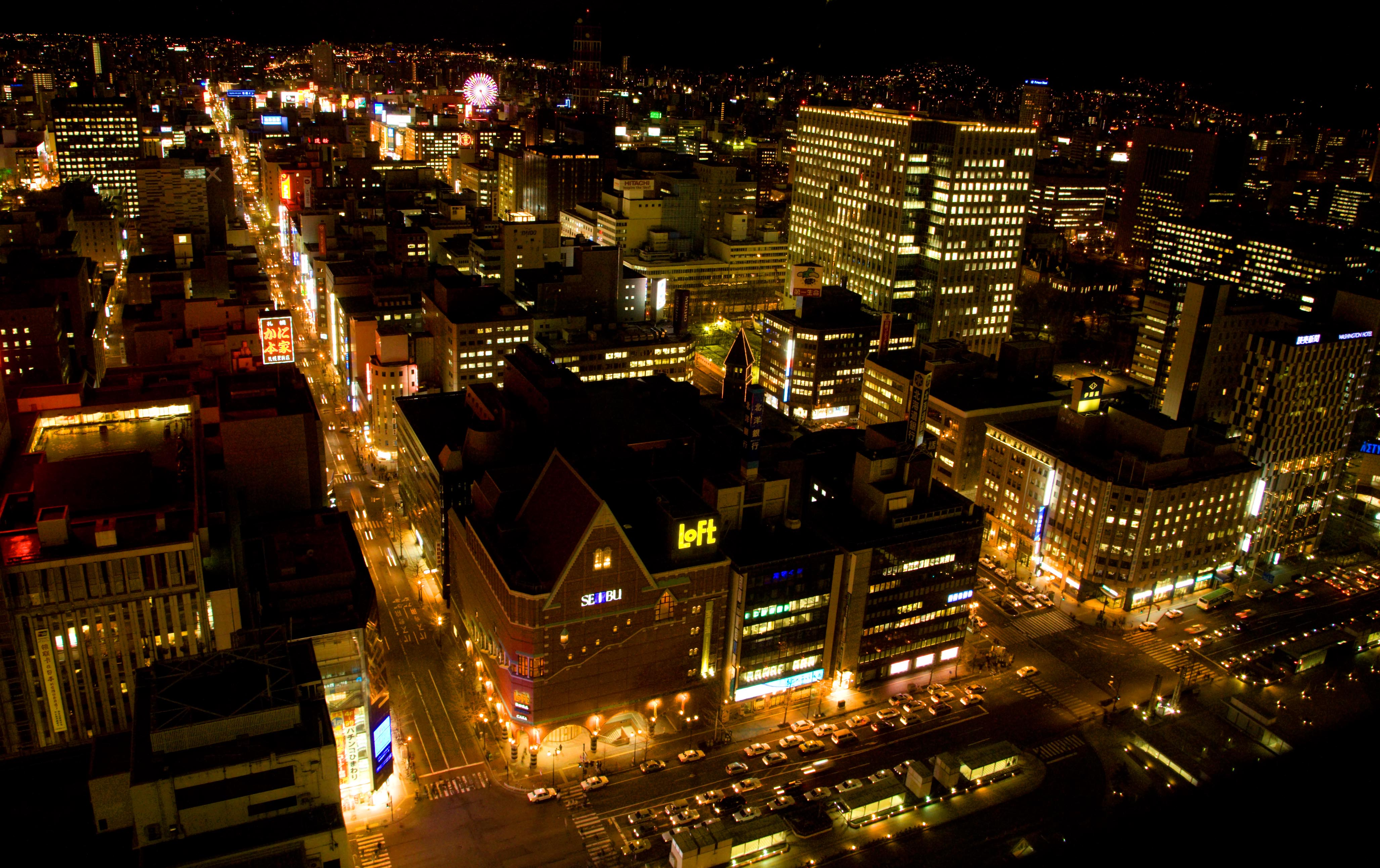
Sapporo, Hokkaido's largest city

Hokkaido's largest city is the capital, Sapporo, which is a designated city. The island has two core cities: Hakodate in the south and Asahikawa in the central region. Other important population centers include Tomakomai, Iwamizawa, Kushiro, Obihiro, Kitami, Abashiri, Wakkanai, and Nemuro.

=== Gallery ===
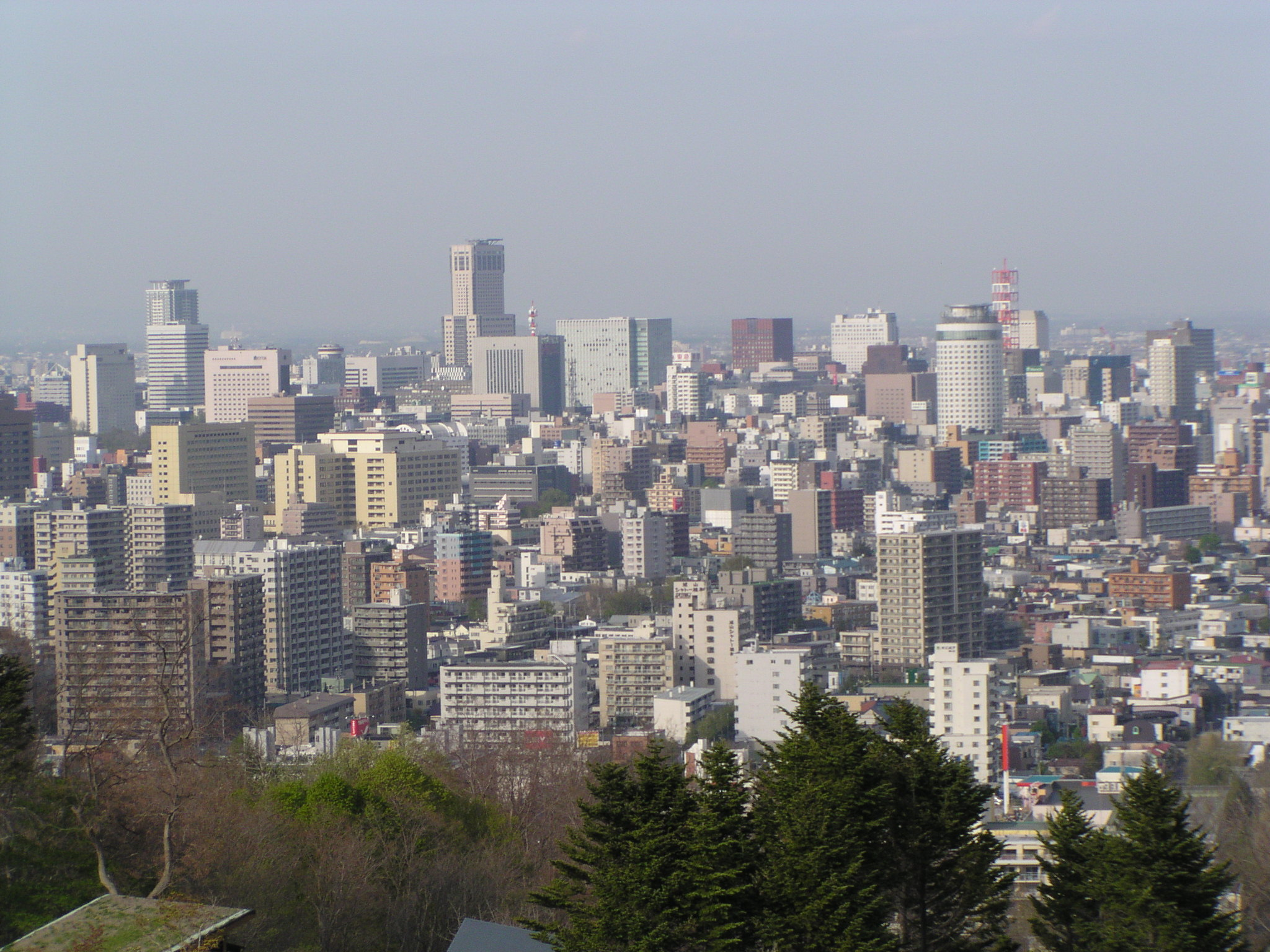
Sapporo City

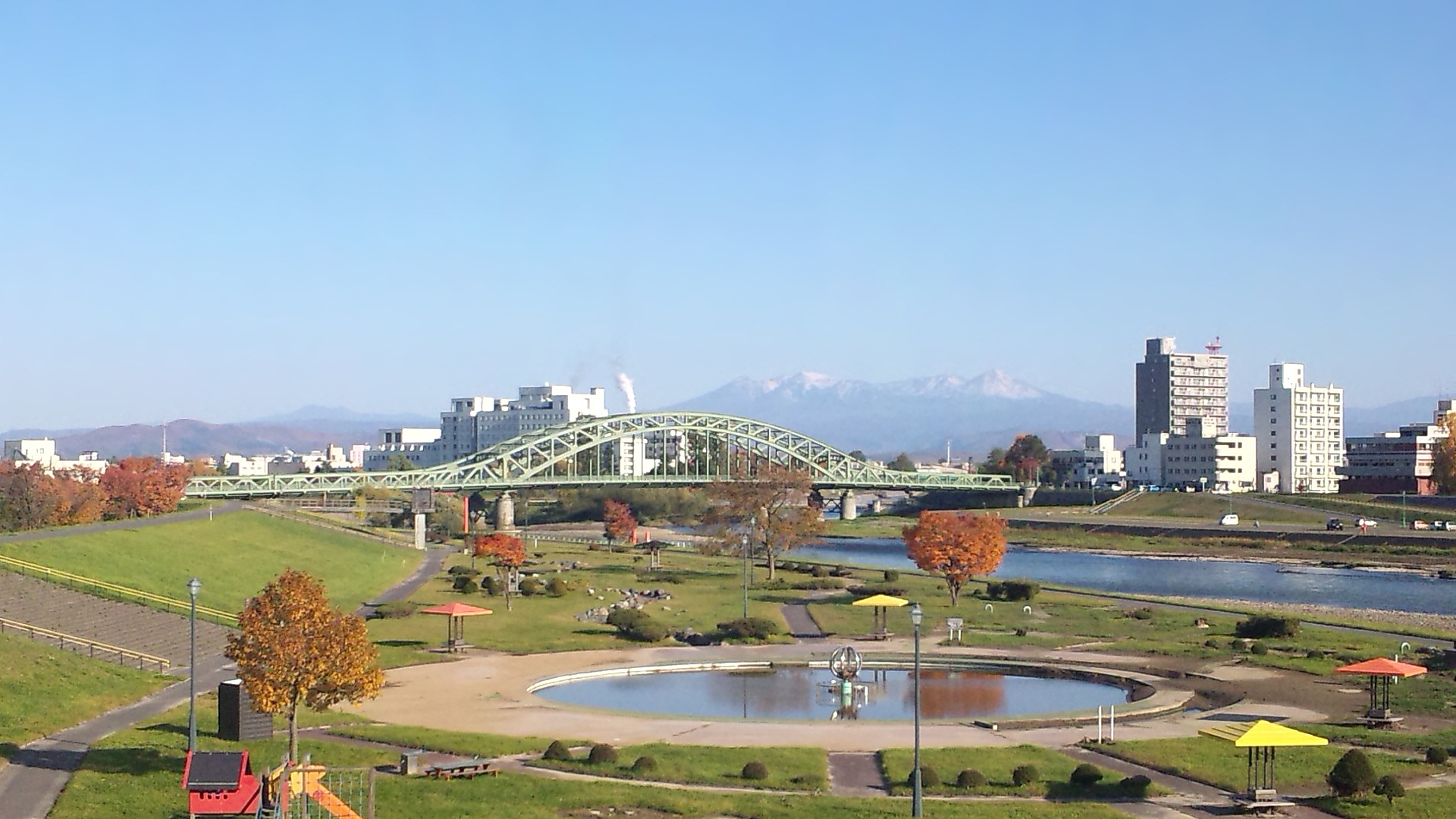
Asahikawa

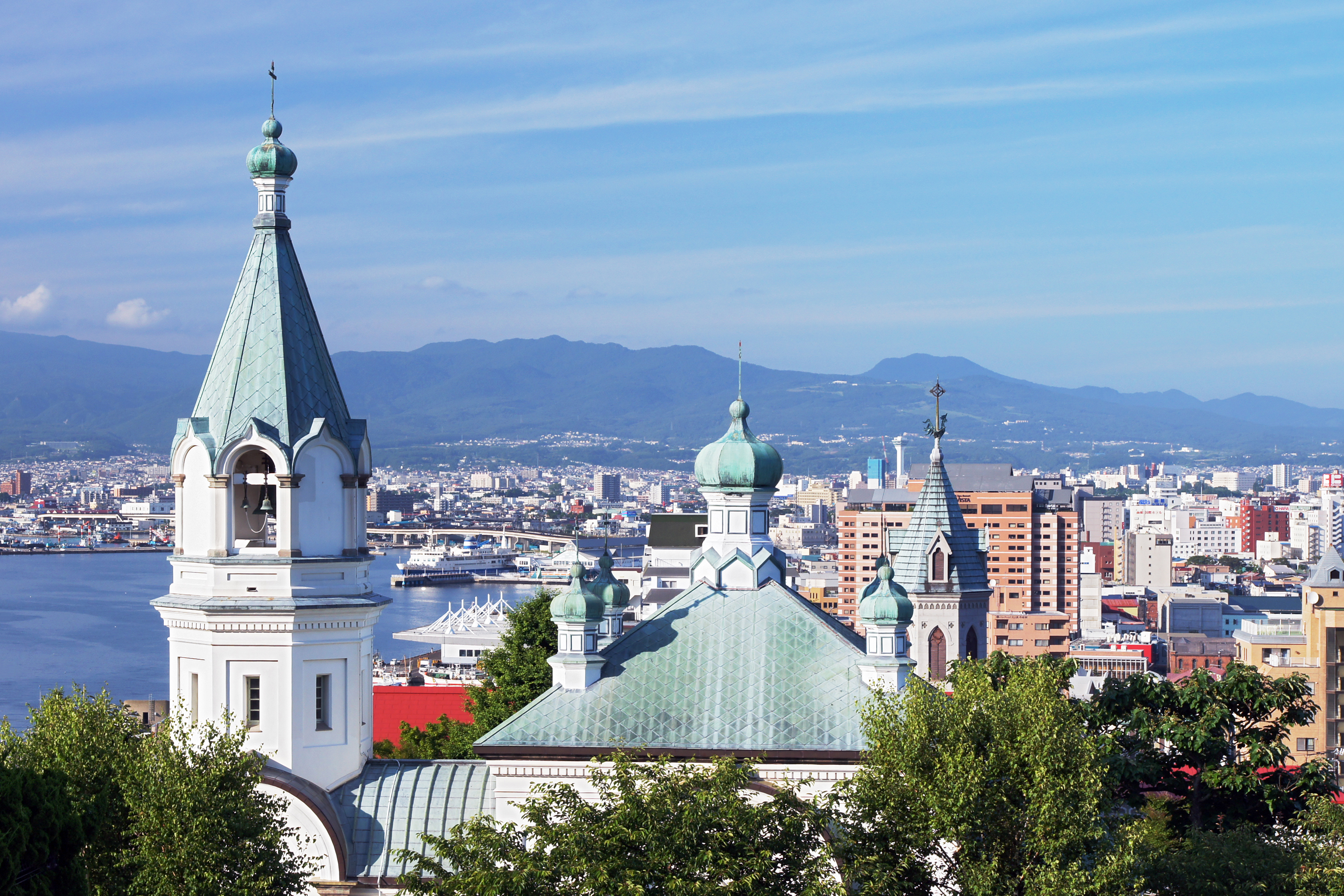
Hakodate

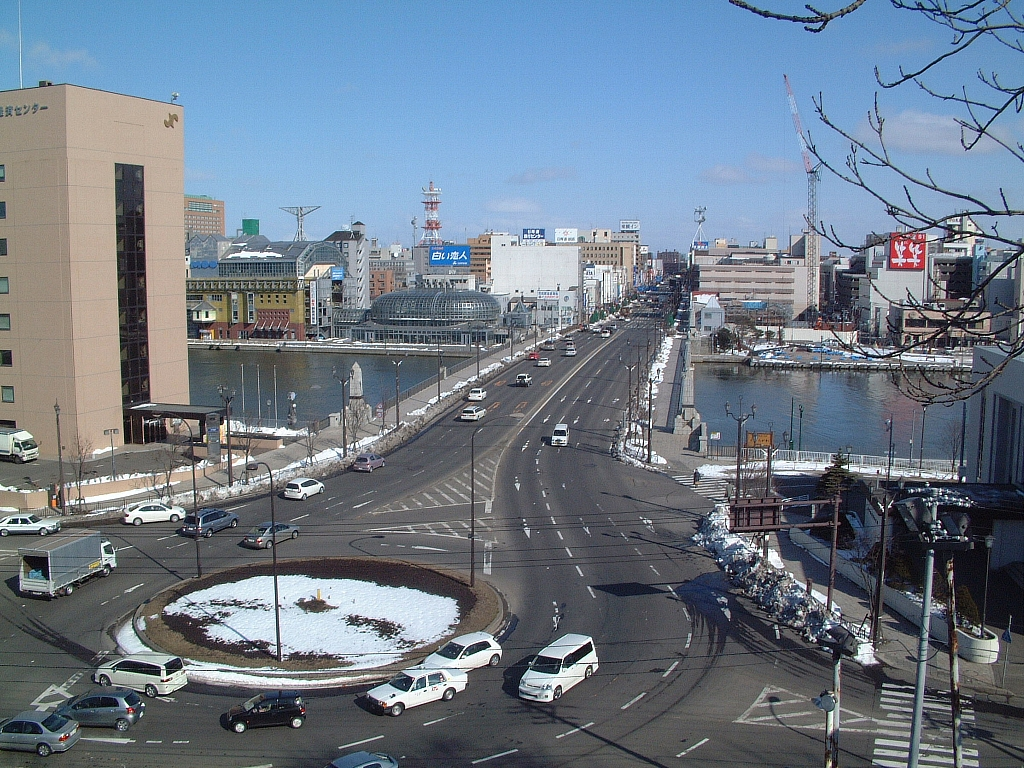
Kushiro

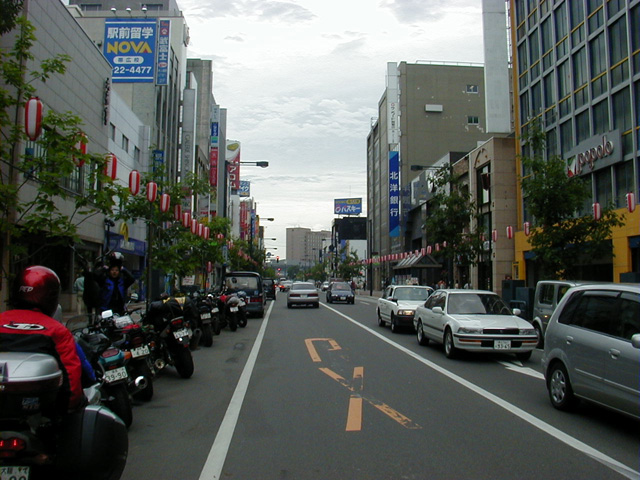
Obihiro

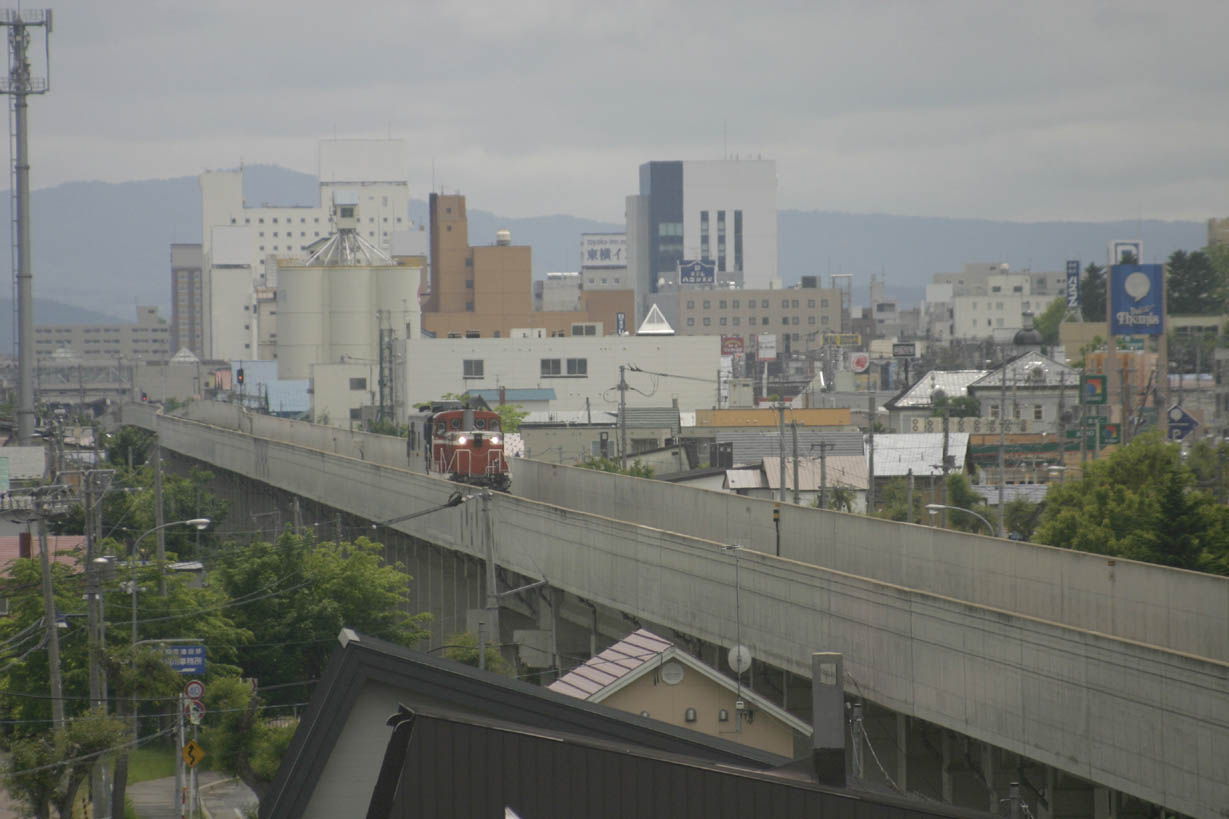
Kitami

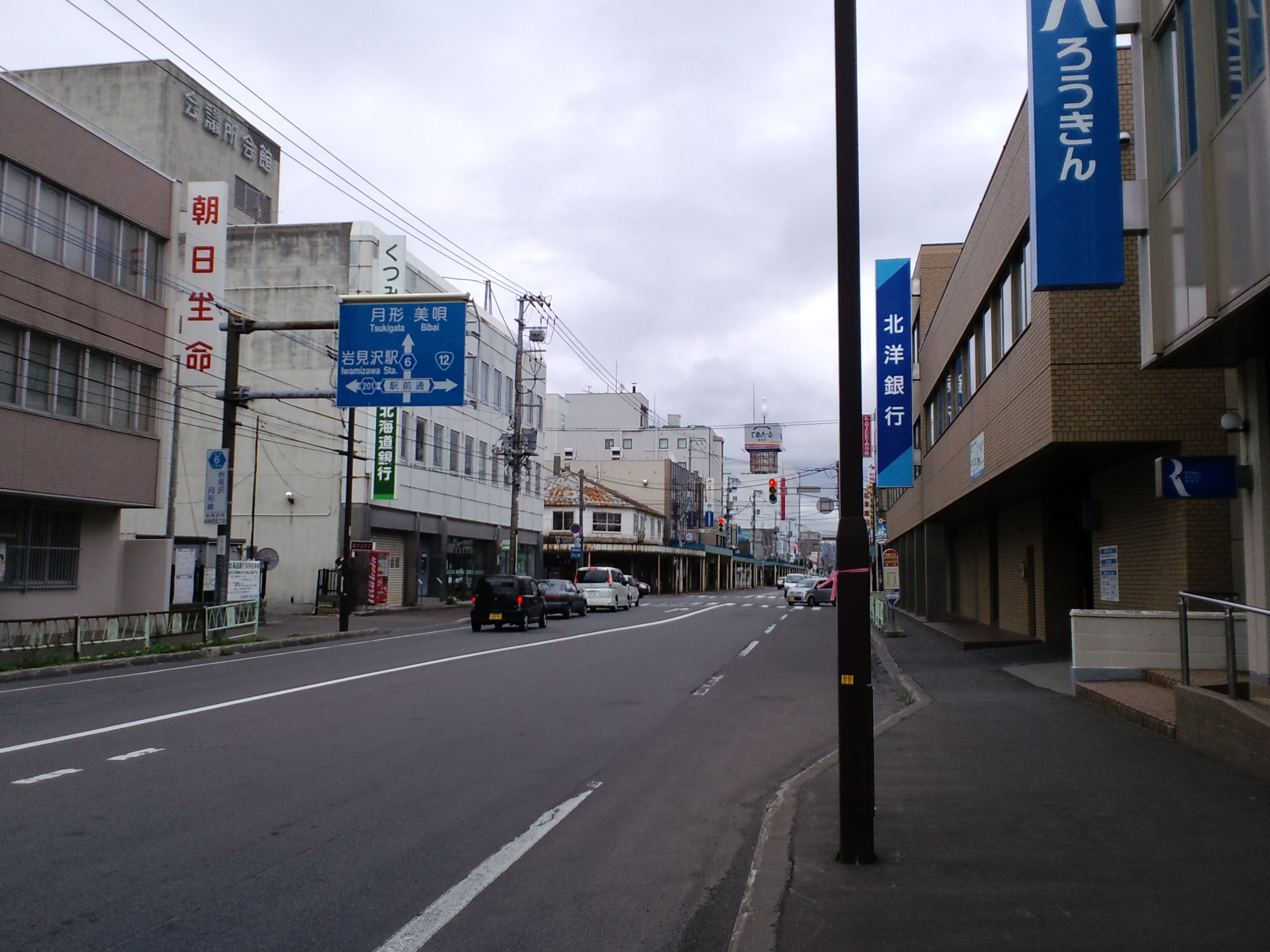
Iwamizawa

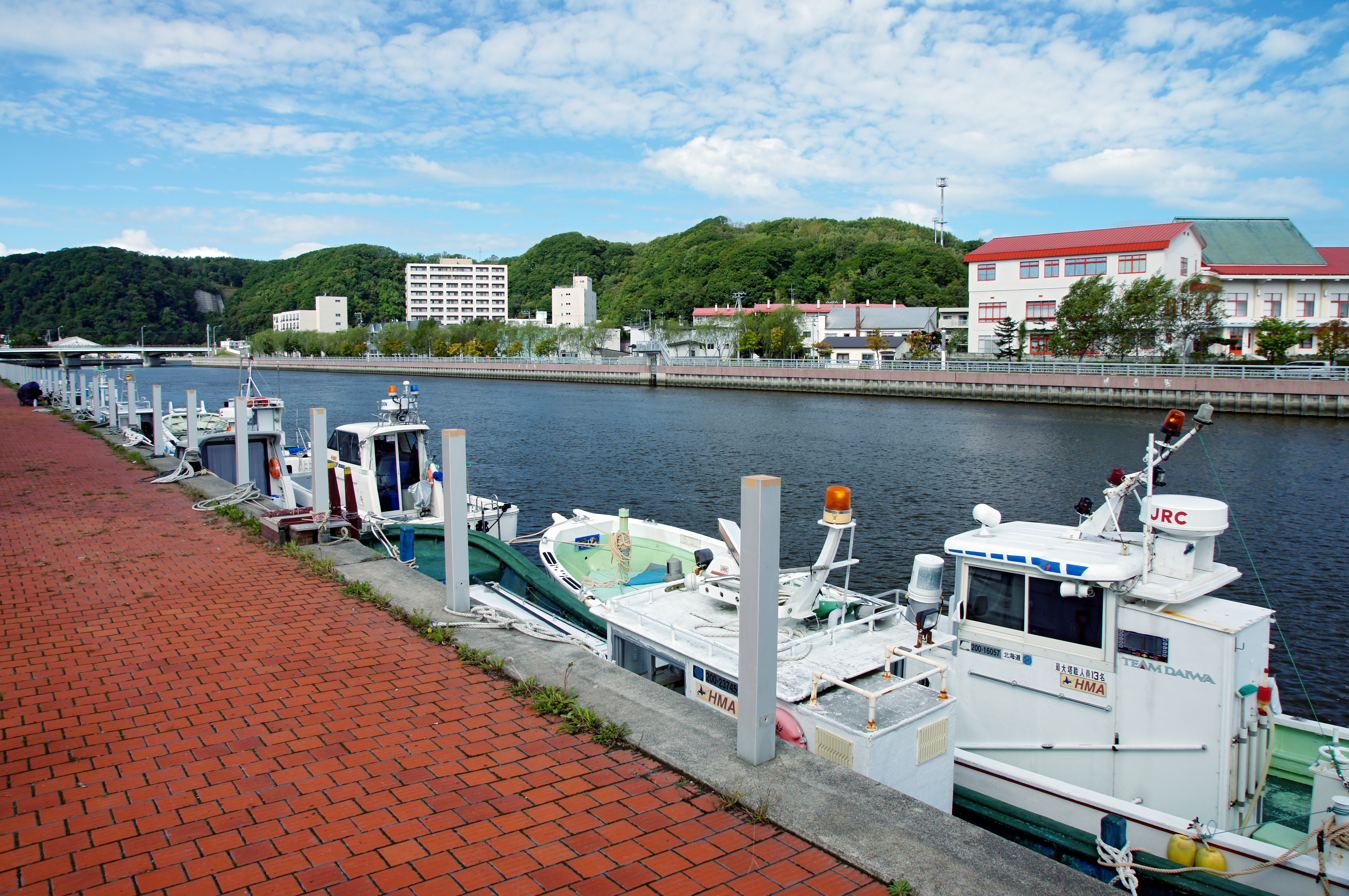
Abashiri

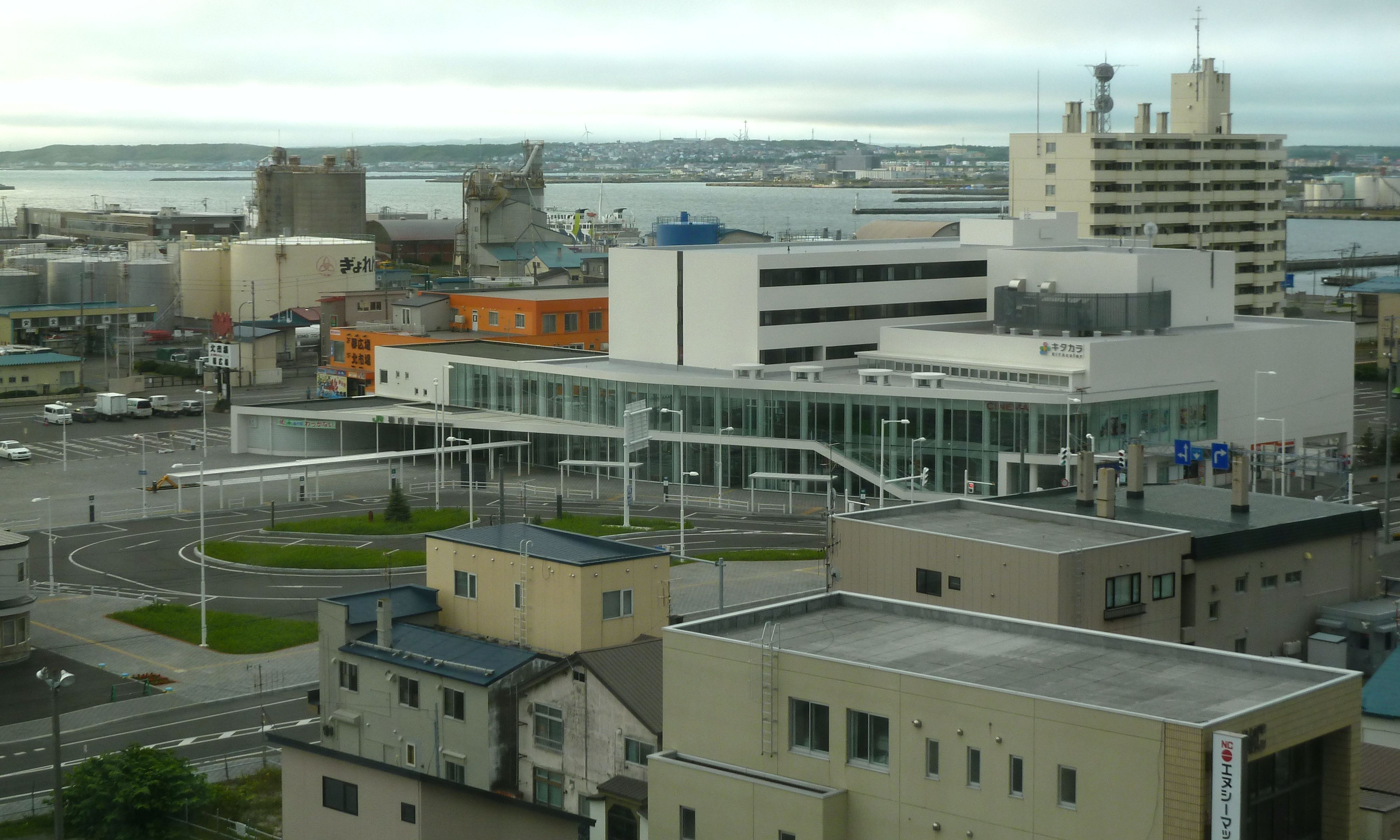
Wakkanai

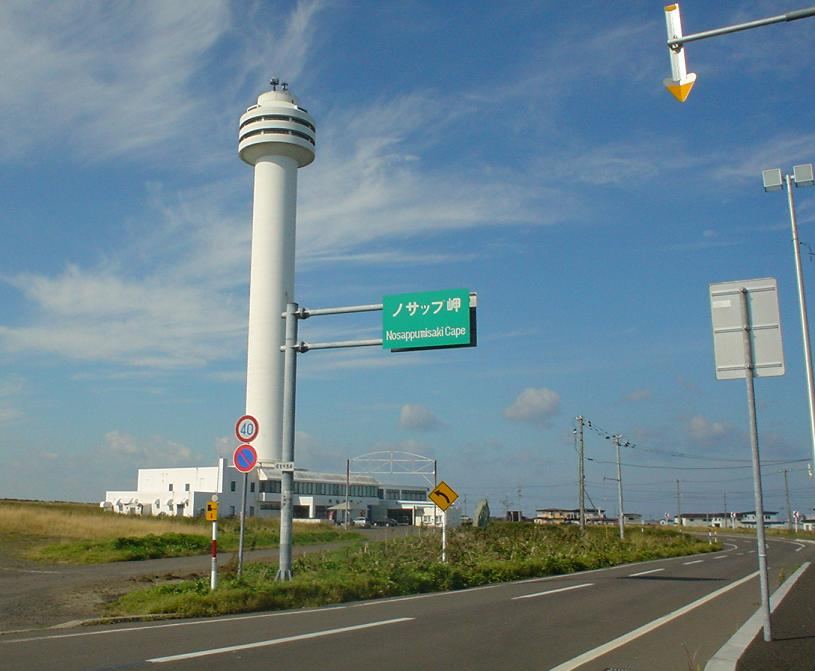
Nemuro

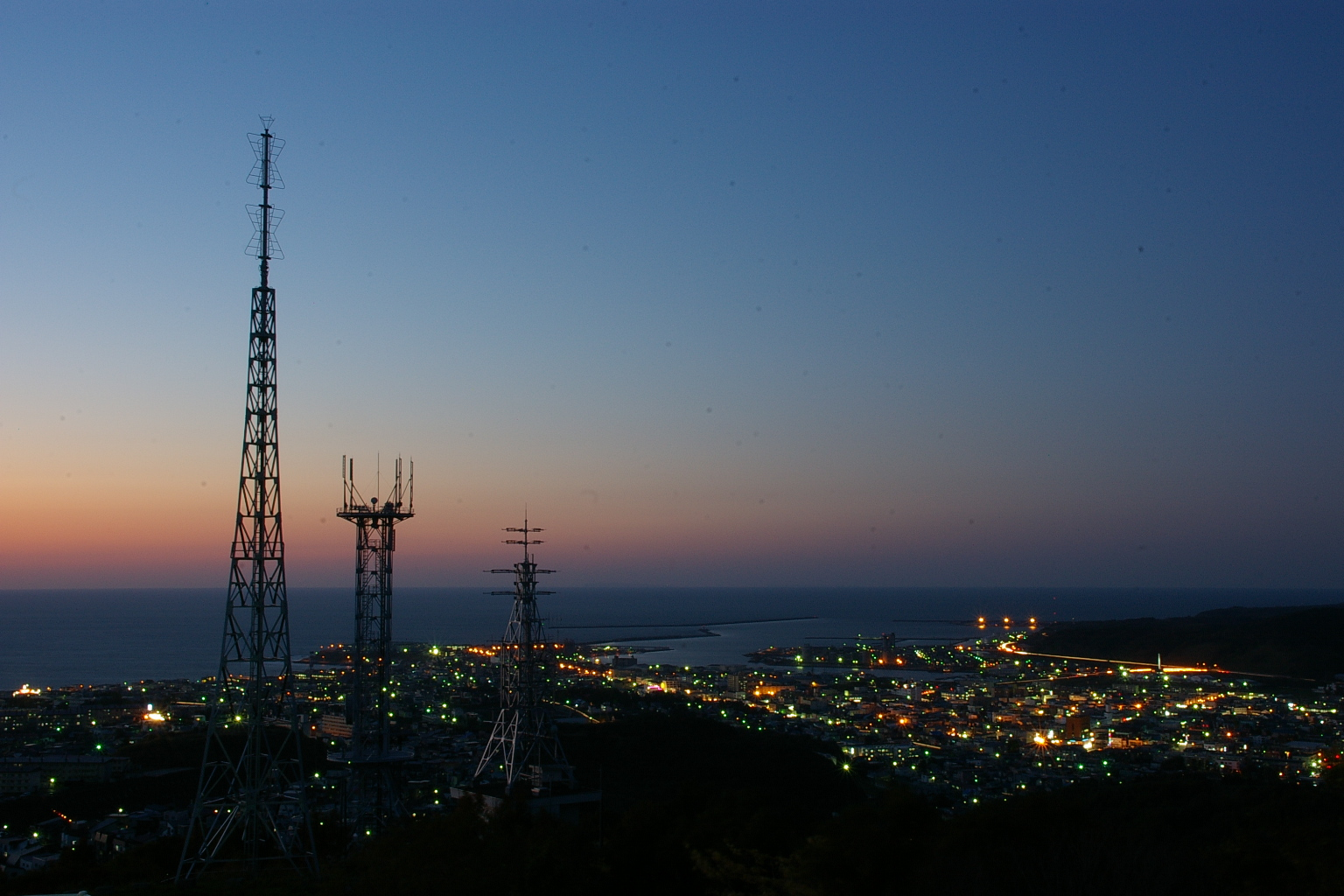
Rumoi

== Population ==
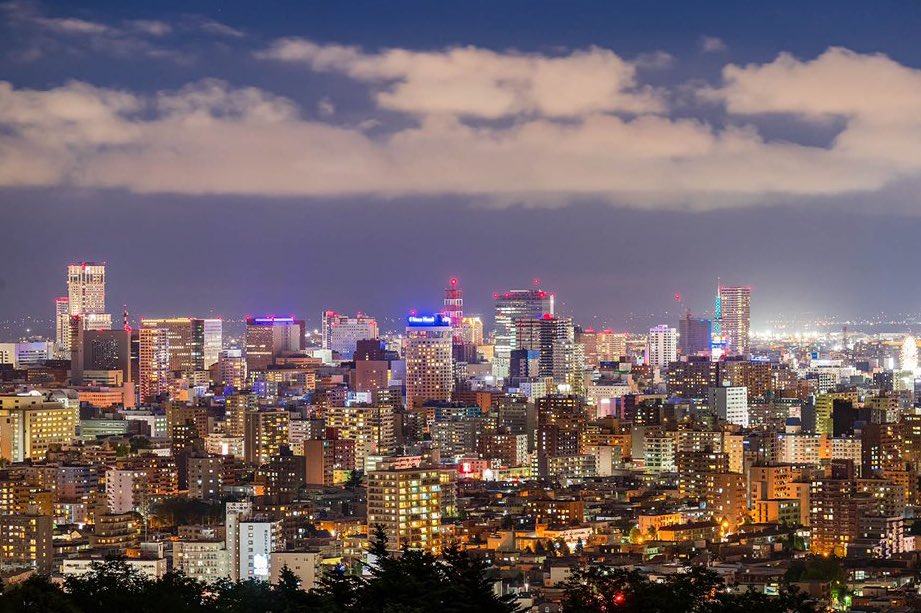
Skyline of Sapporo city, the most populous city in Hokkaido and the 5th most populous city in Japan

Hokkaido population pyramid in 2020

Hokkaido has the third-largest population of Japan's five main islands, with 4,985,419 people as of October 2025. It has the lowest population density in Japan, with just 60 inhabitants per square kilometre (160/sq mi). Hokkaido ranks 21st in population among the world's islands. Major cities include Sapporo and Asahikawa in the central region, and the port of Hakodate facing Honshu in the south. Sapporo is Hokkaido's largest city and the fifth-largest in Japan. It had a population of 1,959,750 as of 31 July 2023 and a population density of 1,748/km^{2} (4,530/sq mi).

City(-shi)	Inhabitants July 31, 2023
Sapporo	1,959,750
Asahikawa	321,906
Hakodate	241,747
Kushiro	158,741
Tomakomai	167,372
Obihiro	163,084
Otaru	107,432
Kitami	112,185
Ebetsu	118,764
Muroran	77,173
Iwamizawa	75,949
Chitose	98,047
Eniwa	70,278

Historical population

Year	Pop.	±% p.a.
1721	15,615	—
1750	21,807	+1.16%
1786	26,310	+0.52%
1798	28,711	+0.73%
1822	61,948	+3.26%
1834	67,862	+0.76%
1846	70,887	+0.36%
1873	123,668	+2.08%
1890	414,430	+7.37%
1903	1,089,503	+7.72%
1920	2,359,183	+4.65%

Year	Pop.	±% p.a.
1930	2,812,335	+1.77%
1940	3,272,718	+1.53%
1950	4,295,567	+2.76%
1960	5,039,206	+1.61%
1970	5,184,287	+0.28%
1980	5,575,989	+0.73%
1990	5,643,647	+0.12%
2000	5,683,062	+0.07%
2010	5,506,419	−0.32%
2020	5,224,614	−0.52%
2025	4,985,419	−0.93%

== Economy ==
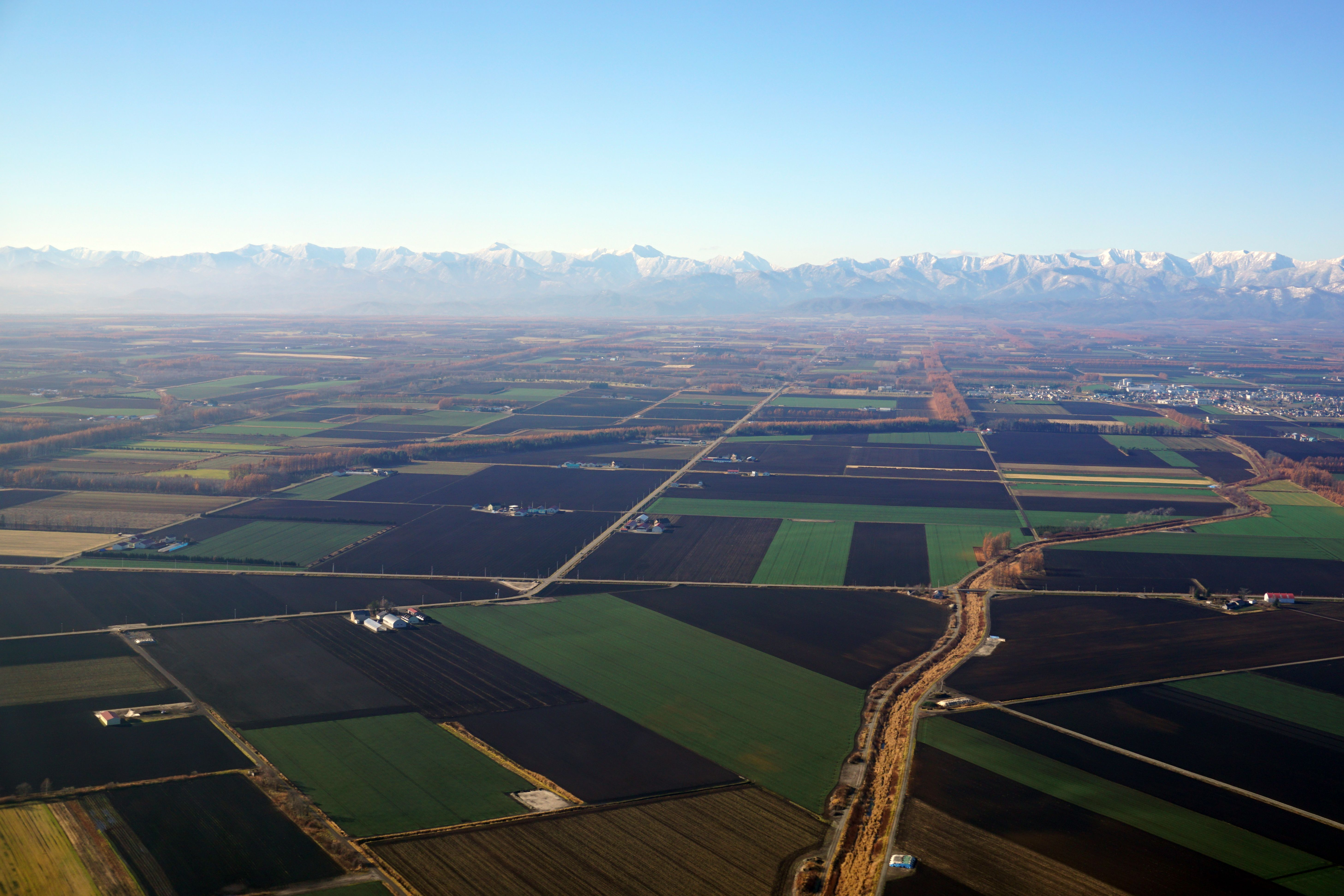
Large farms on the Tokachi plain

Although there is some light industry (most notably paper milling and beer brewing) most of the population is employed by the service sector. In 2001, the service sector and other tertiary industries generated more than three-quarters of the gross domestic product.

Agriculture and other primary industries play a large role in Hokkaido's economy. Hokkaido has nearly one fourth of Japan's total arable land. It ranks first in the nation in the production of a host of agricultural products, including wheat, soybeans, potatoes, sugar beets, onions, pumpkins, corn, raw milk, and beef. Hokkaido also accounts for 22% of Japan's forests with a sizable timber industry. The prefecture is first in the nation in production of marine products and aquaculture. The average farm size in Hokkaido is 26 hectares per farmer in 2013, which is almost 11 times bigger than the national average of 2.4 hectares.

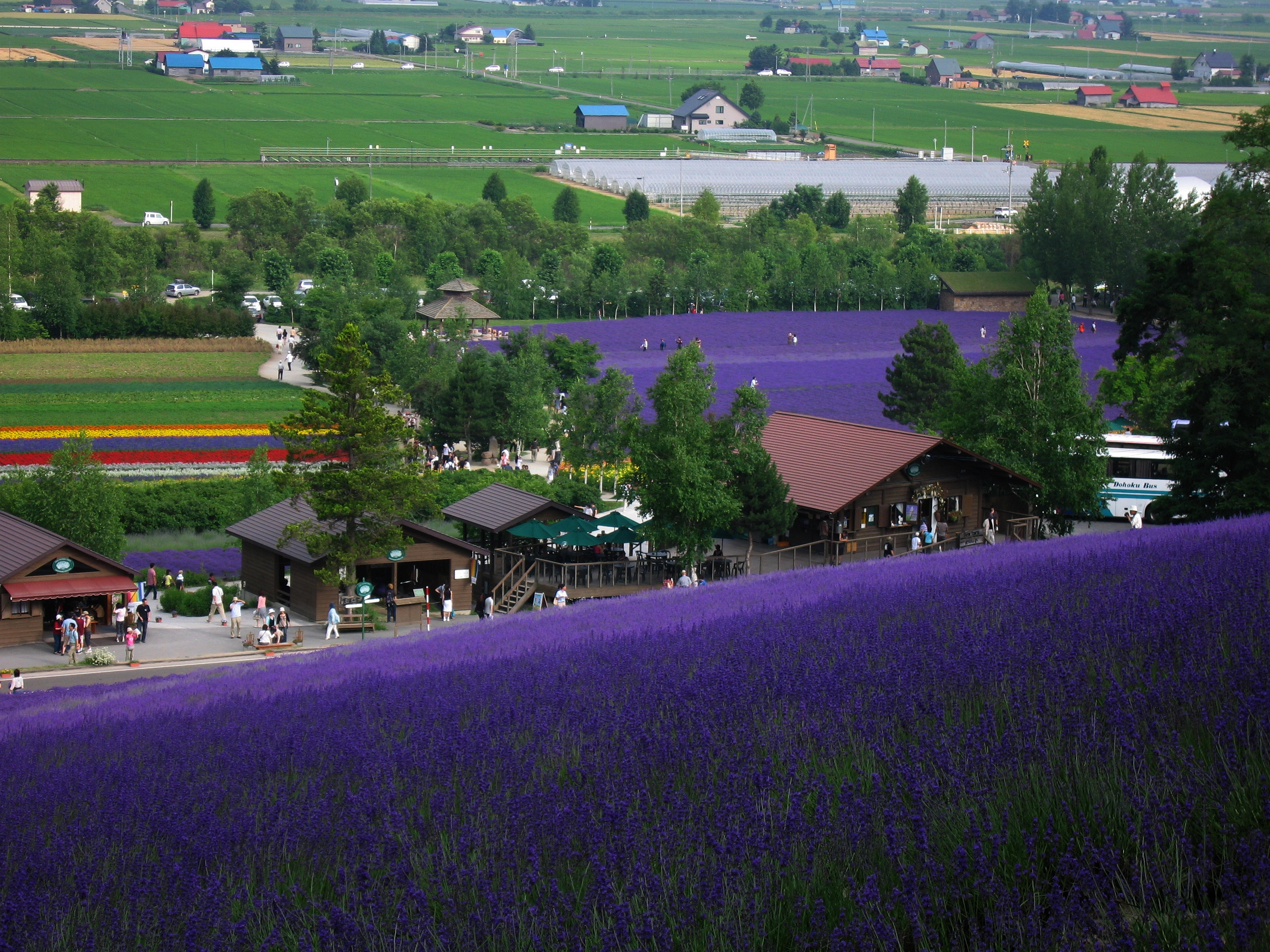
Farm Tomita in Nakafurano

Tourism is an important industry, especially during the cool summertime when visitors are attracted to Hokkaido's open spaces from hotter and more humid parts of Japan and other Asian countries. During the winter, skiing and other winter sports bring other tourists, and increasingly international ones, to the island.

Coal mining played an important role in the industrial development of Hokkaido, with the Ishikari coalfield. Cities such as Muroran were primarily developed to supply the rest of the archipelago with coal.

In 2023, Rapidus Corporation announced Hokkaido's largest business investment with a 5 trillion yen plan to build a semiconductor manufacturing factory in Chitose. The site is expected to eventually employ over 1,000 employees.

== Transportation ==
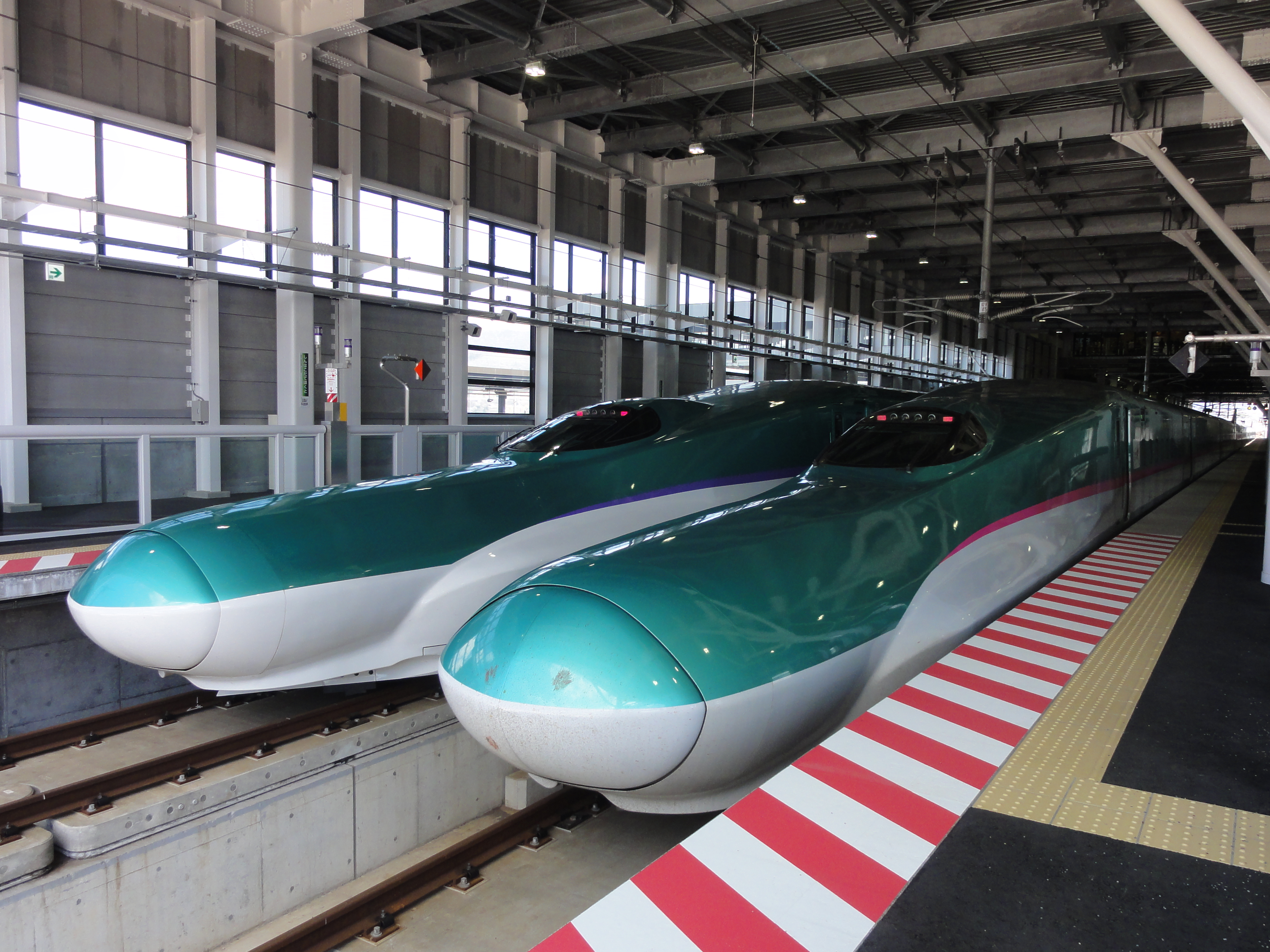
Shin-Hakodate-Hokuto Station on the Hokkaido Shinkansen

Hokkaido's only land link to the rest of Japan is the Seikan Tunnel. Most travellers travel to the island by air: the main airport is New Chitose Airport at Chitose, just south of Sapporo. One of the airlines, Air Do was named after Hokkaido.

Hokkaido can be reached by ferry from Sendai, Niigata and some other cities, with the ferries from Tokyo dealing only in cargo. The Hokkaido Shinkansen takes passengers from Tokyo to near Hakodate in slightly over four hours. There is a fairly well-developed railway network, but many cities can be accessed only by road. The coal railways were constructed around Sapporo and Horonai during the late 19th century, as advised by American engineer Joseph Crawford.

Hokkaido is home to one of Japan's Melody Roads, which is made from grooves cut into the ground, which when driven over causes a tactile vibration and audible rumbling transmitted through the wheels into the car body.

== Education ==
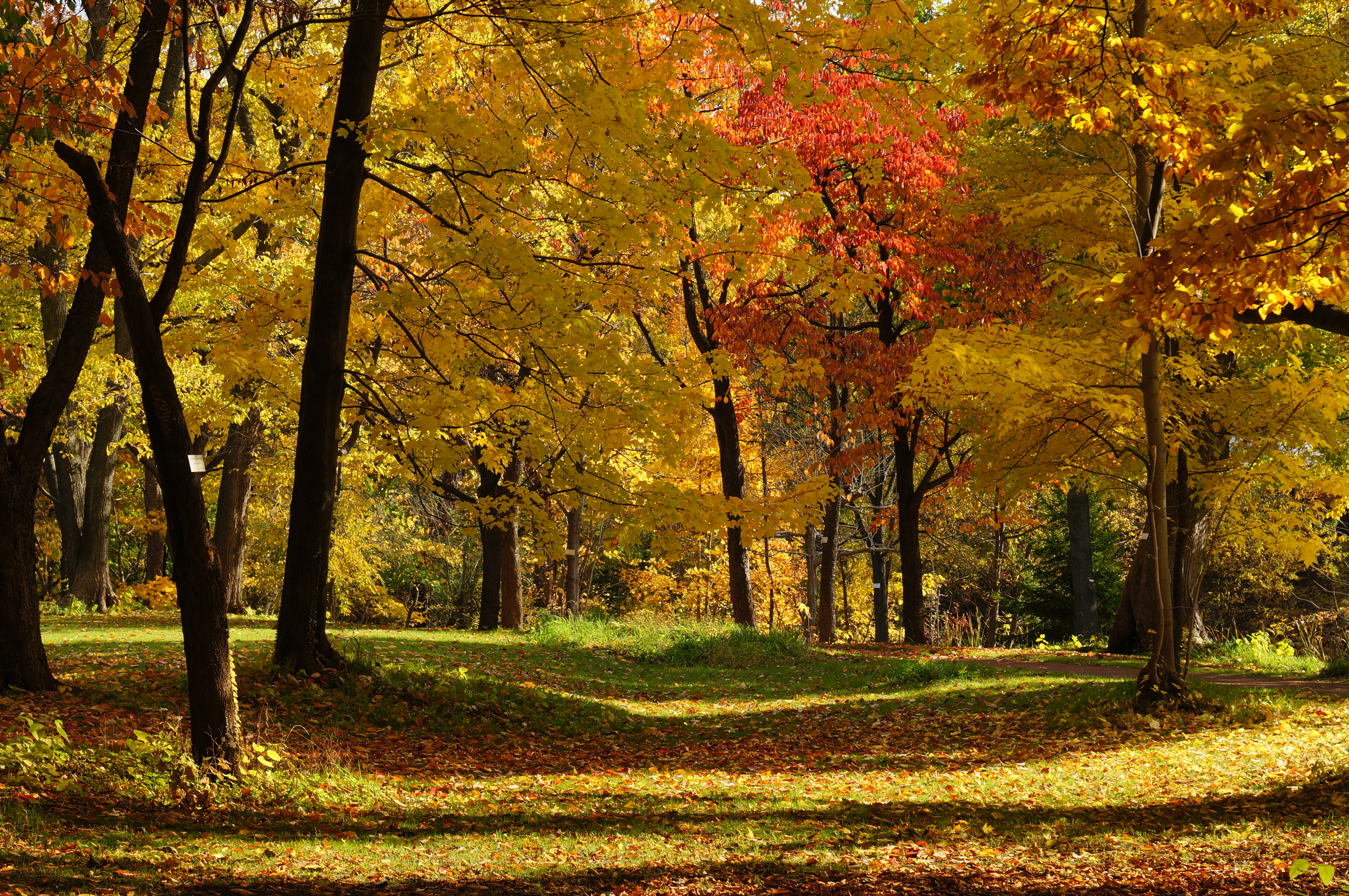
Hokkaido University Botanical Gardens

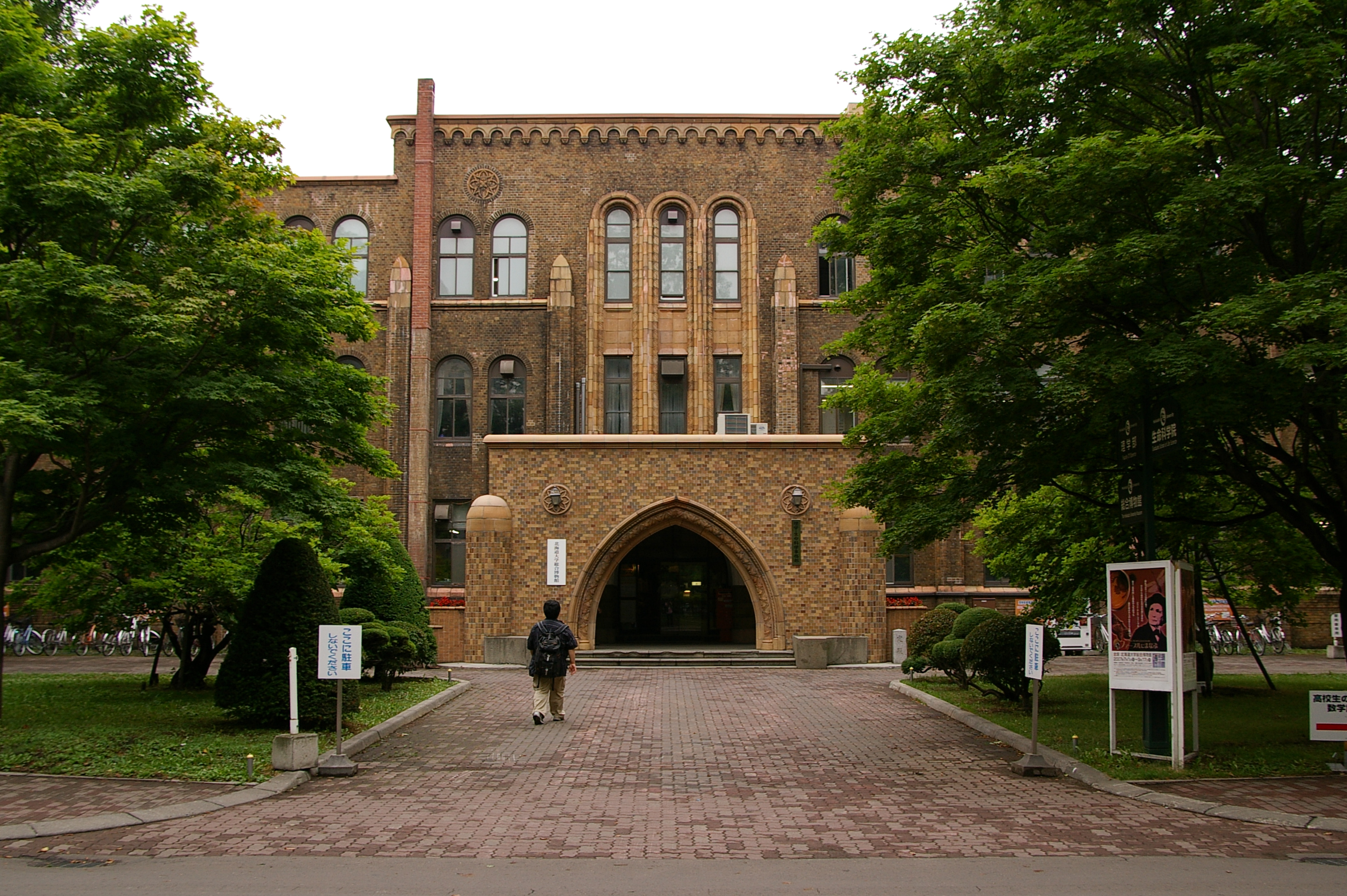
Hokkaido University Museum

The Hokkaido Prefectural Board of Education oversees public schools (except colleges and universities) in Hokkaido. Public elementary and junior high schools are operated by municipalities, except Hokkaido Noboribetsu Akebi Secondary School and schools attached to the Hokkaido University of Education. Public high schools are operated by either the prefectural board or municipalities.

=== Senior high schools ===
As of 2016, there are 291 high schools in Hokkaido: 4 national schools, 55 private schools, 233 public schools, and 2 integrated junior-senior schools.

=== Colleges and universities ===
Hokkaido has 34 universities (7 national, 6 local public, and 21 private universities), 15 junior colleges, and 6 colleges of technology (3 national, 1 local public, and 2 private colleges).

== Culture ==
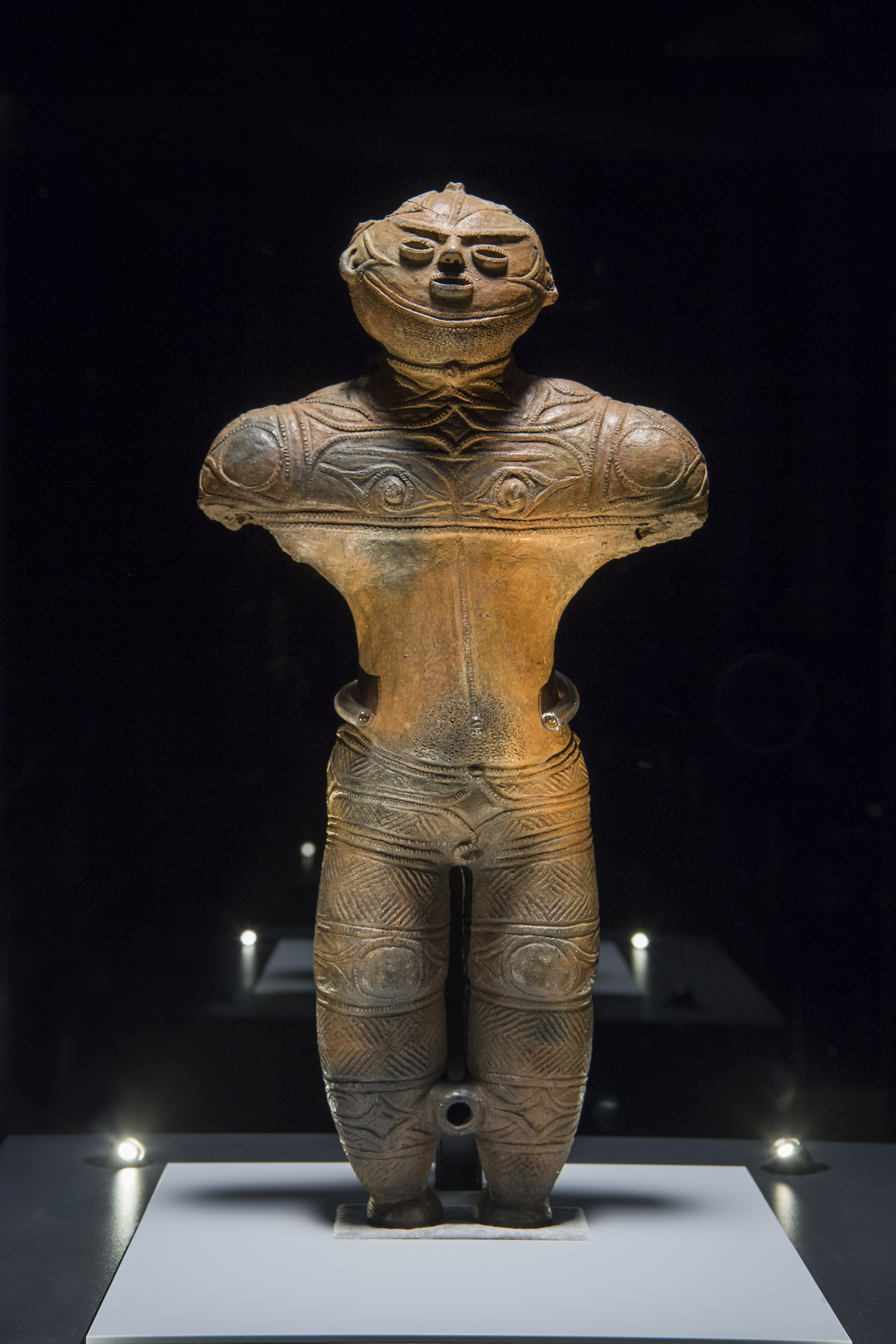
Hollow Dogū, the only National Treasure on the island (Hakodate Jōmon Culture Center)

- Historical Village of Hokkaido
- Hokkaido Archaeological Operations Center
- Hokkaido Heritage
- Hokkaido Museum
- Hokkaido Museum of Modern Art
- Hokkaido Museum of Northern Peoples
- Pacific Music Festival
- Sapporo ramen, Jingisukan

== Sports ==
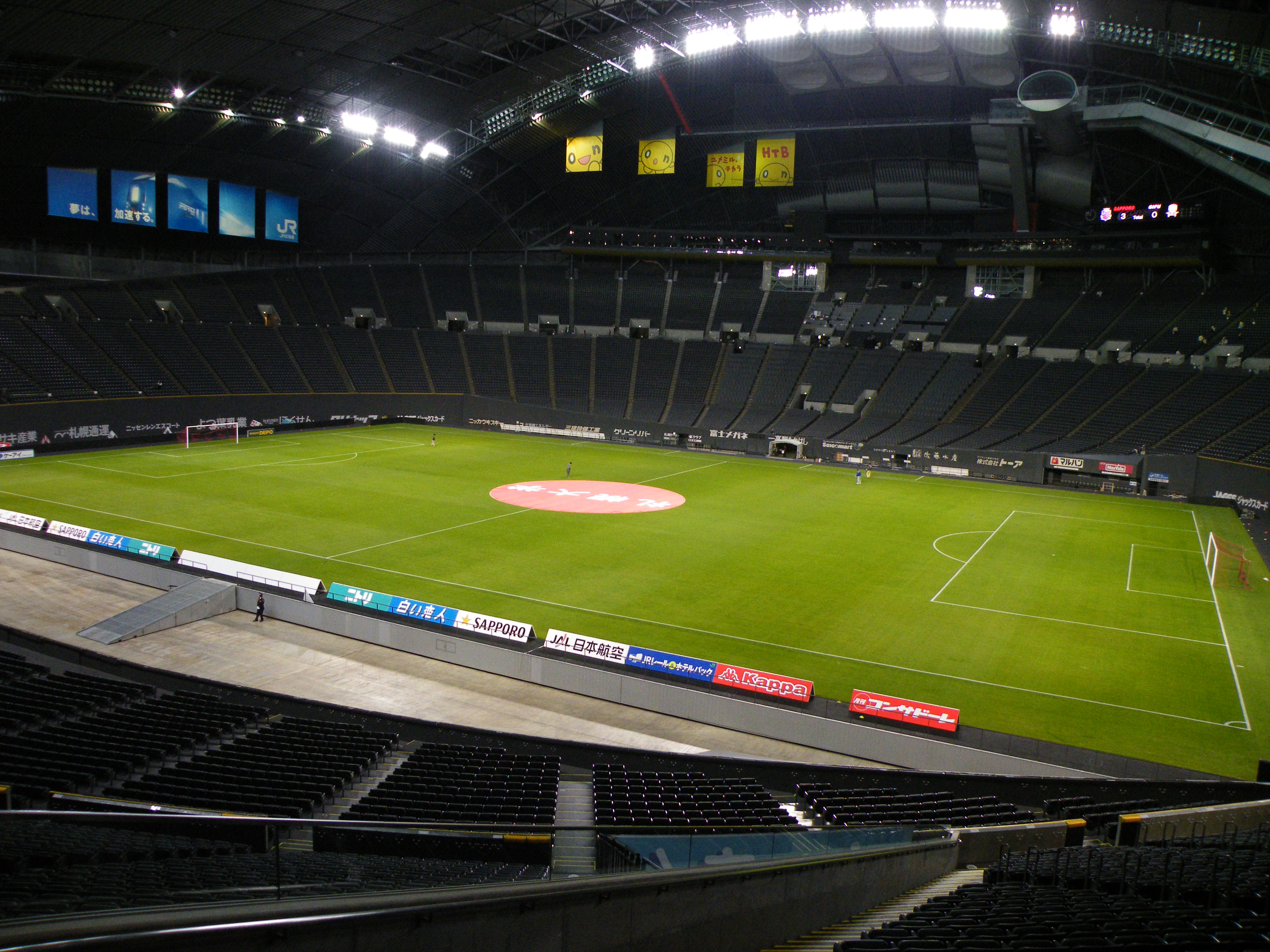
The Sapporo Dome in Sapporo

The 1972 Winter Olympics were held in Sapporo.

The sports teams listed below are based in Hokkaido.

- Consadole Sapporo (association football)
- Hokkaido American Football Association
- Hokkaido Nippon-Ham Fighters
- Japan Basketball League
- Levanga Hokkaido (basketball)
- Loco Solare (curling)
- Nippon Paper Cranes (ice hockey)
- Oji Eagles (ice hockey)

=== Sumo ===
Hokkaido enjoys a special status in professional sumo as the prefecture that has produced the most yokozuna in Japan. A total of eight wrestlers have achieved the highest rank in the professional hierarchy: Chiyonoyama, Yoshibayama, Taihō, Kitanofuji, Kitanoumi, Chiyonofuji, Hokutoumi, and Ōnokuni. Historically, the prefecture only experienced a boom in sporting success after the Meiji era, because during this period of economic development and high birth rates, it was common to send young boys to sumo stables in order to limit the number of mouths to feed. The prefecture's golden age came during the Shōwa and Heisei periods, with Chiyonofuji, Hokutoumi, and Ōnokuni all reaching the rank of yokozuna and Hokuten'yū reaching the rank of ōzeki at the same time. Since then, the prefecture has slowed down considerably, with the last title won by a native of the prefecture taking place in 1991. On the amateur scene, only five high school clubs participating in national tournaments have more than 16 members, according to a 2020 study.

== Winter festivals ==
- Asahikawa Ice Festival
- Big Air – snowboarding freestyle competition
- Sapporo Snow Festival
- Shōwa-Shinzan International Yukigassen - competitive snowballing
- Sōunkyō Ice Festival

== Politics ==
=== Governor ===
The current governor of Hokkaido is Naomichi Suzuki. He won the governorship in the gubernatorial election in 2019 as an independent. In 1999, Hori was supported by all major non-Communist parties and Itō ran without party support. Before 1983, the governorship had been held by Liberal Democrats Naohiro Dōgakinai and Kingo Machimura for 24 years. In the 1971 election when Machimura retired, the Socialist candidate Shōhei Tsukada lost to Dōgakinai by only 13,000 votes; Tsukada was also supported by the Communist Party – the leftist cooperation in opposition to the US-Japanese security treaty had brought joint Socialist-Communist candidates to victory in many other prefectural and local elections in the 1960s and 1970s. In 1959, Machimura had defeated Yokomichi's father Setsuo in the race to succeed Hokkaido's first elected governor, Socialist Toshibumi Tanaka who retired after three terms. Tanaka had only won the governorship in 1947 in a run-off election against Democrat Eiji Arima because no candidate had received the necessary vote share to win in the first round as required by law at the time.

=== Assembly ===
The Hokkaido Legislative Assembly has 100 members from 47 electoral districts. As of April 2015, the LDP caucus holds a majority with 51 seats, the DPJ-led group has 26 members. Other groups are the Hokkaido Yūshikai of New Party Daichi and independents with twelve seats, Kōmeitō with eight, and the Japanese Communist Party with four members. General elections for the Hokkaido assembly are currently held together with gubernatorial elections in the unified local elections (last round: April 2015).

=== National representation ===
For the lower house of the National Diet, Hokkaido is divided into twelve single-member electoral districts. In the 2017 election, candidates from the governing coalition of Liberal Democrats and Kōmeitō won seven districts and the main opposition Constitutional Democrats five. For the proportional election segment, Hokkaido and Tokyo are the only two prefectures that form a regional "block" district of their own. The Hokkaido proportional representation block elects eight Representatives.

In 2017, the Liberal Democratic Party received 28.8% of the proportional vote and won three seats, the Constitutional Democratic Party won three (26.4% of the vote), one seat each went to Kibō no Tō (12.3%) and Kōmeitō (11.0%). The Japanese Communist Party, who won a seat in 2014, lost their seat in 2017 while receiving 8.5% of the votes.

In the upper house of the National Diet, a major reapportionment in the 1990s halved the number of Councillors from Hokkaido per election from four to two. After the elections of 2010 and 2013, the Hokkaido electoral district – like most two-member districts for the upper house – was represented by two Liberal Democrats and two Democrats. In the 2016 upper house election, the district magnitude would be raised to three, Hokkaido would then temporarily be represented by five members and six after the 2019 election.

== International relations ==
Hokkaido has relationships with several provinces, states, and other entities worldwide.

- Alberta, Canada, since 1980
- Heilongjiang, China, since 1980
- Massachusetts, United States, since 1988
- Sakhalin Oblast, Russia, since 1998
- Busan, South Korea, since 2005
- Gyeongsangnam-do, South Korea, since 2006
- Seoul, South Korea, since 2010
- Chiang Mai, Thailand, since 2013
- Thimphu, Bhutan
- Hawaii, United States

As of January 2014, 74 individual municipalities in Hokkaido have sister city agreements with 114 cities in 21 countries worldwide.

== See also ==
- Former Hokkaido Government Office
- Golden Kamuy, a manga and anime series set mainly in Hokkaido.
- Hokkaido dialects
- List of cities in Hokkaido by population
- People from Hokkaido
- Sankebetsu brown bear incident
- Sinnoh, a fictional region in the Pokémon franchise which is based on Hokkaido.
