= Yūbari =

Yūbari (夕張) may refer to:

- Yūbari, Hokkaidō, Japan
- Yūbari District, Hokkaidō, Japan
- Yūbari Mountains, in Hokkaidō, Japan
- Yūbari River, in Hokkaidō, Japan
- Mount Yūbari, in Hokkaidō, Japan
- Yubari King, a type of melon
- Japanese cruiser Yūbari
- Yubari-class destroyer escort

== See also ==
- Yuba (disambiguation)
