= Kuriyama Station =

Railway station in Kuriyama, Hokkaido, Japan

Coordinates: 43.0580°N 141.7757°E

Kuriyama Station 栗山駅
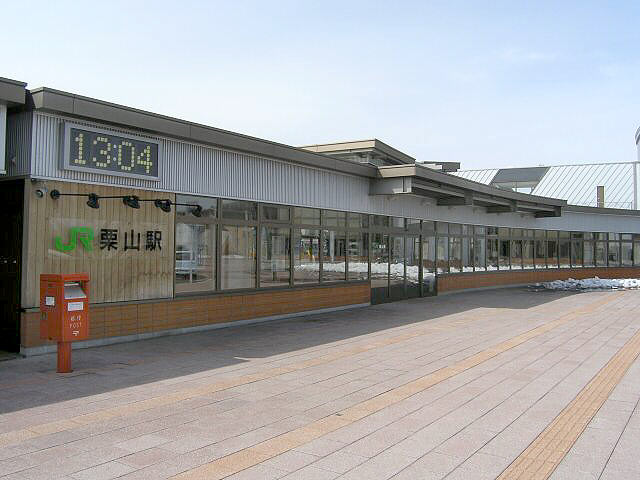
- Station building complex, April 2005

General information
- Location: Kuriyama, Hokkaido; Japan
- Operator: JR Hokkaido
- Line: ■ Muroran Main Line
- Distance: 191.5 km from Oshamambe
- Platforms: 2 side platforms
- Tracks: 2
- Connections: Bus stop

Other information
- Status: Staffed

History
- Opened: July 1, 1893
Location

Kuriyama Station (栗山駅, Kuriyama-eki) is a train station in Kuriyama, Yūbari District, Hokkaidō, Japan.

== Lines ==
Kuriyama Station is served by the Muroran Main Line.

== Station layout ==
The station has two ground-level opposed side platforms serving two tracks. Kitaca is not available.

=== Platforms ===
1	■ Muroran Main Line	for Oiwake and Tomakomai
2	■ Muroran Main Line	for Iwamizawa

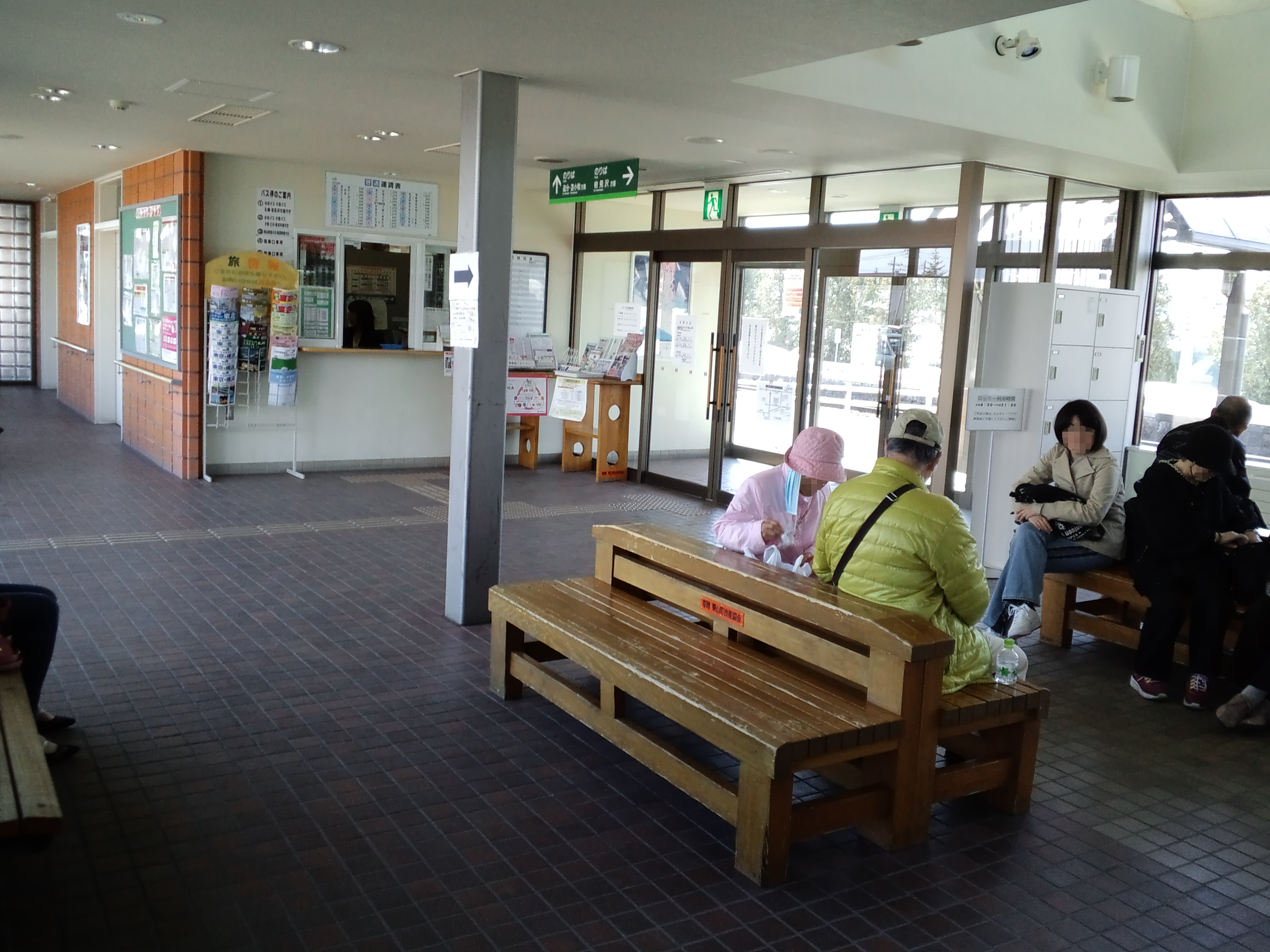
Inside the station

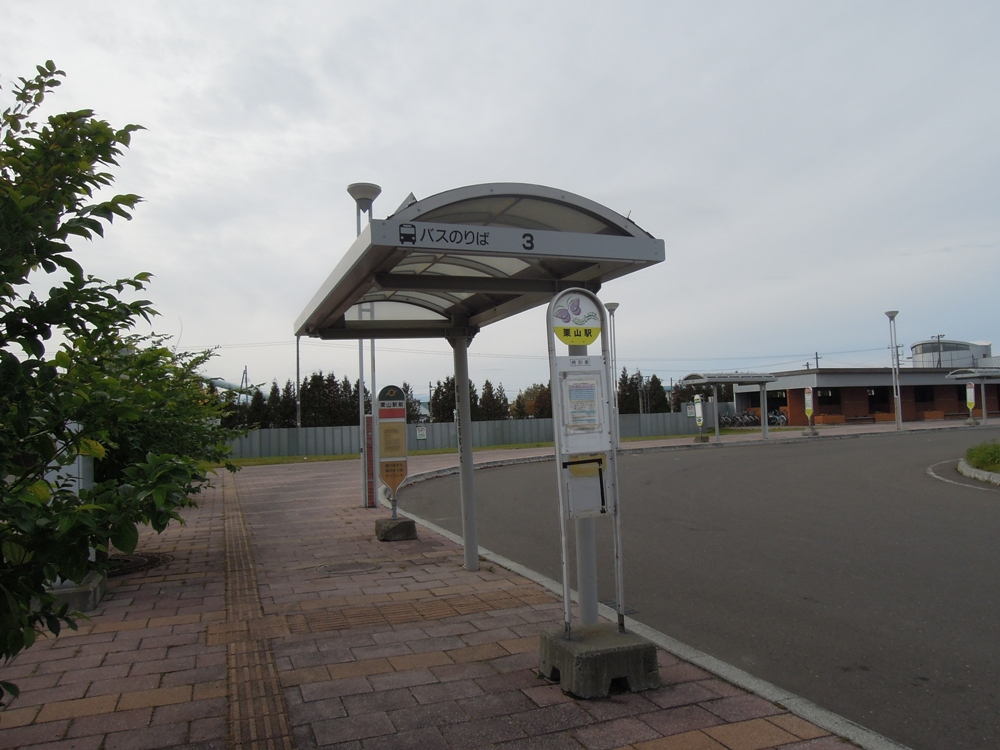
Bus stop

== Adjacent stations ==
«	Service	»
Muroran Main Line
Yuni	-	Kurioka

== Surrounding area ==
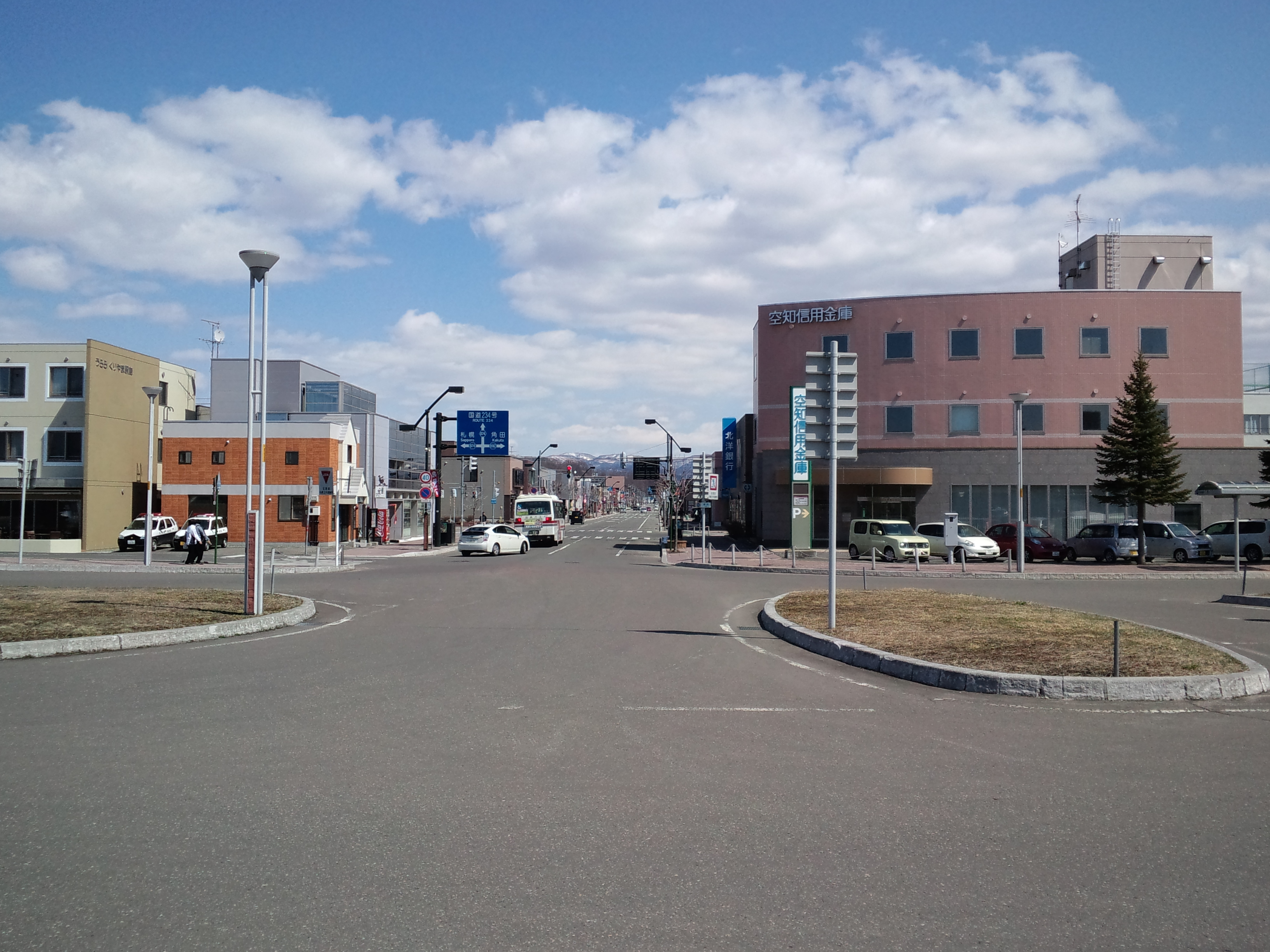
view from the entrance

- National Route 234
- Yūbari River
