= Yuni =

Yuni may refer to:

- Yuni (film), 2021 internationally co-produced drama film
- Yuni, Hokkaido, a town in Sorachi Subprefecture, Hokkaido, Japan
- Yuni Station, a railway station in Yuni
- Yuni Shara (born 1972), Indonesian singer
- Yuni (Star Twinkle PreCure), a character in the anime series Star Twinkle PreCure
- Yuni (wrestler), Japanese professional wrestler

== See also ==
- Yuny (disambiguation)
- Yuna (disambiguation)
