= Ōyūbari Dam =

Dam in Hokkaidō Prefecture, Japan

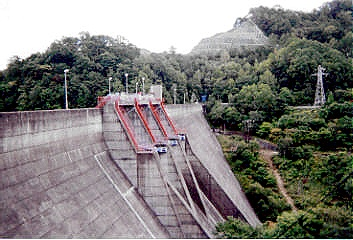
- Interactive map of Ōyūbari Dam
- Location: Hokkaidō, Japan
- Coordinates: 43.0247°N 142.101°E
- Construction began: 1954
- Opening date: 1962

Dam and spillways
- Impounds: Yūbari River
- Height: 67.5 m
- Length: 251.7 m

Reservoir
- Total capacity: 87,200,000 m^{3}
- Catchment area: 433.0 km^{2}
- Surface area: 475 hectares

The Ōyūbari Dam (大夕張ダム, Ōyūbari damu) is a dam in the city of Yūbari, Hokkaidō, Japan.
