= Shimizusawa Station =

Former railway station in Yūbari, Hokkaido, Japan

Coordinates: 42°59′53.77″N 142°0′26.23″E

Shimizusawa Station 清水沢駅
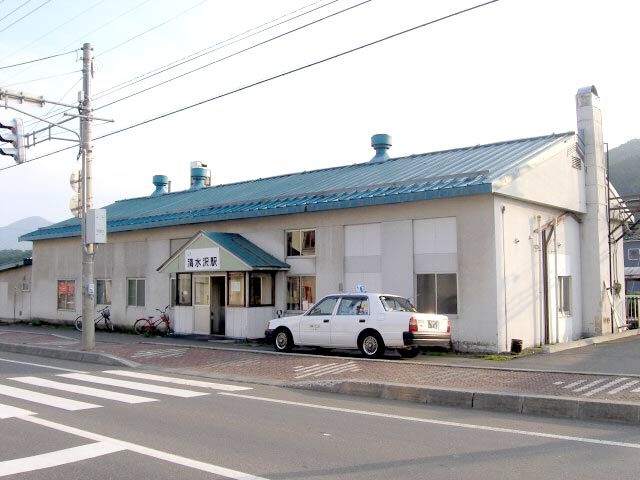
- Station building, July 2004

General information
- Location: Yūbari, Hokkaido; Japan
- Operator: JR Hokkaido
- Line: ■ Sekishō Line Yūbari Branch
- Distance: 8.2 km from Shin-Yūbari
- Platforms: 1 side platform
- Tracks: 1

Other information
- Status: Unstaffed
- Station code: Y23

History
- Opened: February 16, 1897
- Closed: March 31, 2019

Passengers
- FY2007: 20 daily
Location

Shimizusawa Station (清水沢駅, Shimizusawa-eki) was a railway station on the JR Hokkaido Sekishō Line. It is located in Yūbari, Hokkaidō, Japan. The station was closed when the Yubari Branch Line ceased operation on 31 March 2019.

== Lines ==
Shimizusawa Station was served by the Sekisho Line Yūbari Branch. The station was numbered "Y23".

== Station layout ==
The station had one platform serving one track used by both Yūbari-bound and Shin-Yūbari or Oiwake-bound trains. Kitaca was not available. The station was unattended.

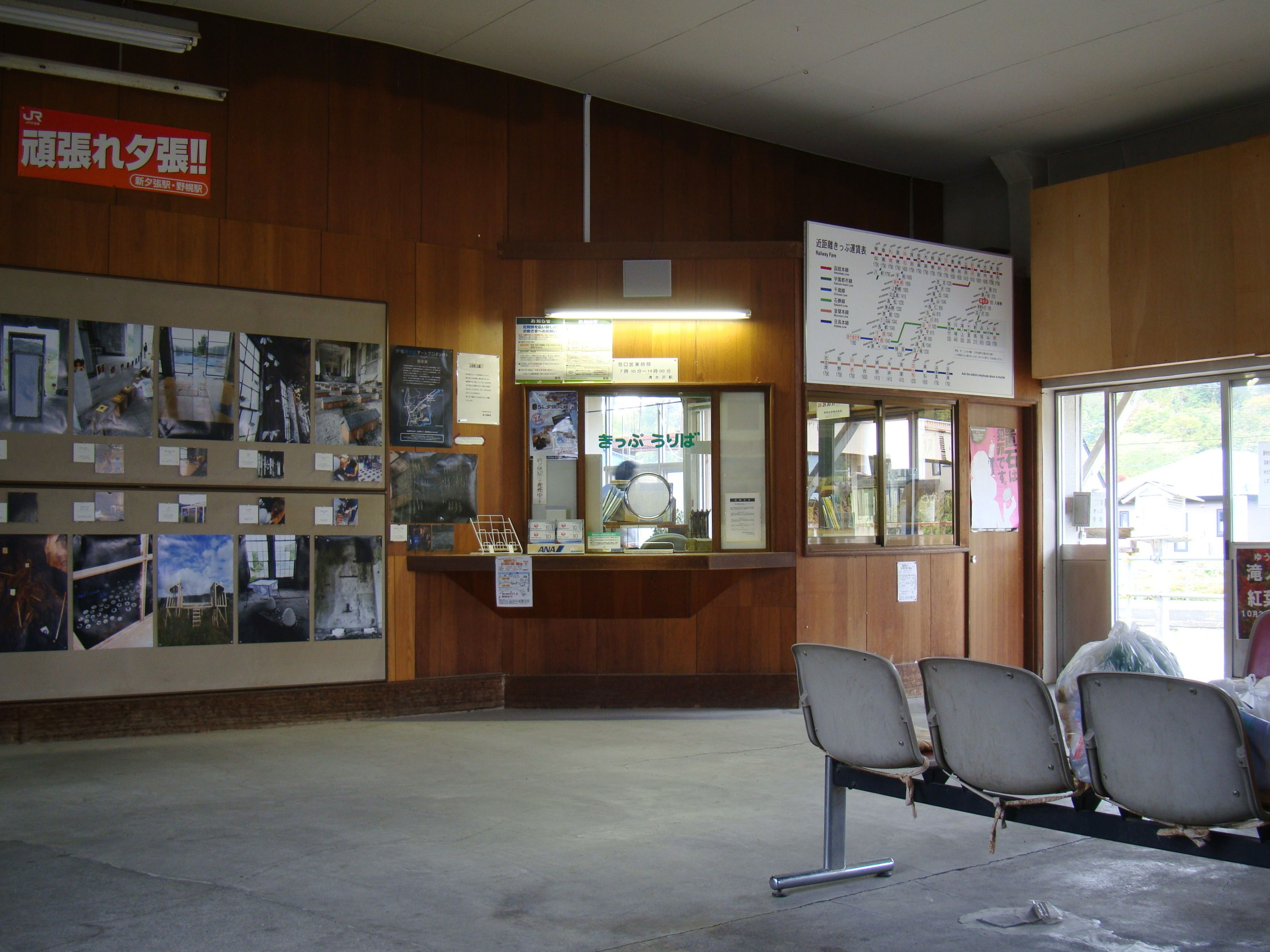
Inside the station

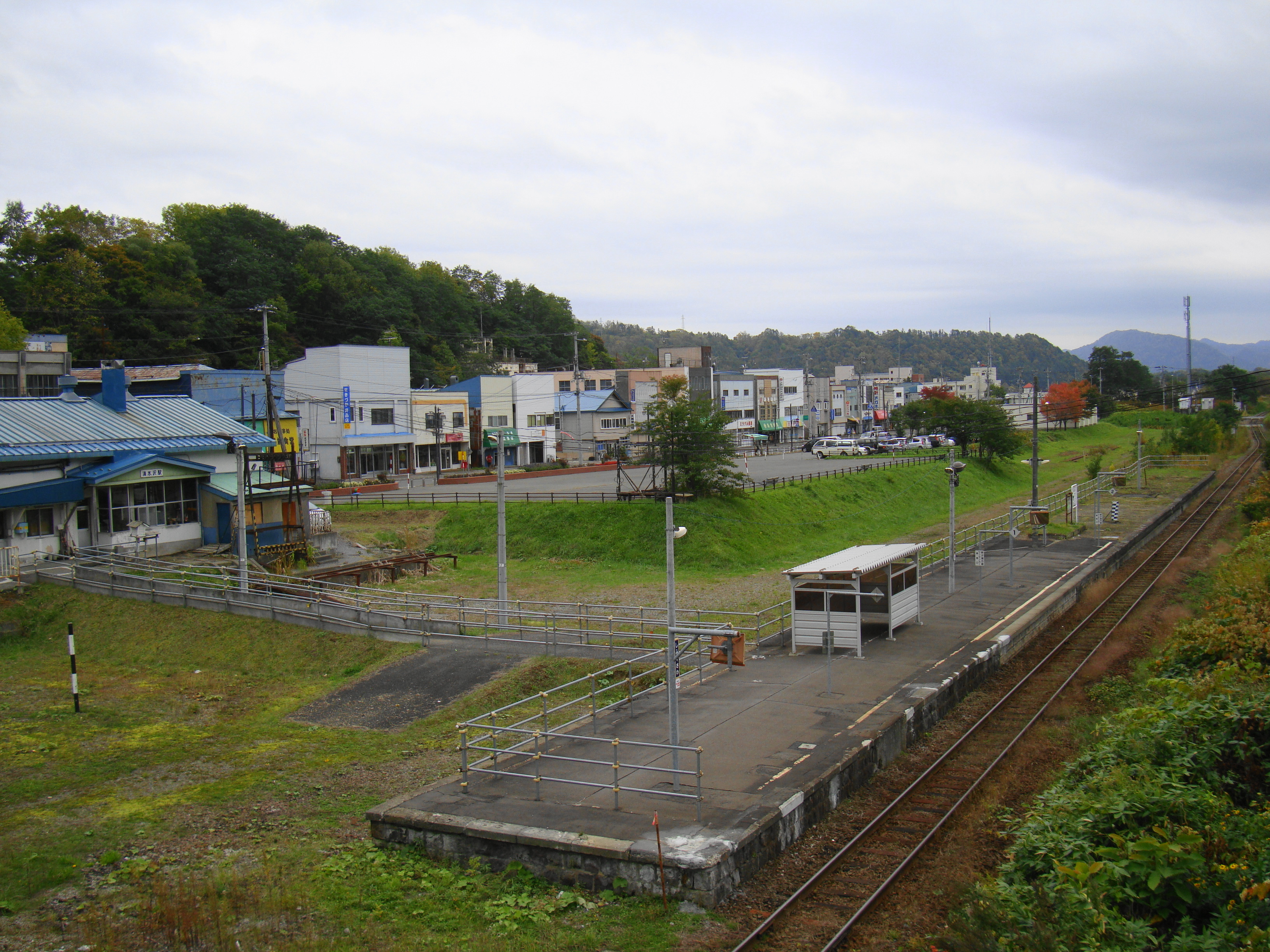
The platform

== Surrounding area ==
- Shimizusawa Post office

== Adjacent stations ==
«	Service	»
Sekisho Line Yūbari Branch
Minami-Shimizusawa (Y22)	Local	Shikanotani (Y24)
