= Mikawa Station (Hokkaido) =

Railway station in Yuni, Hokkaido, Japan

Coordinates: 42°56′42″N 141°48′03″E

Mikawa Station 三川駅
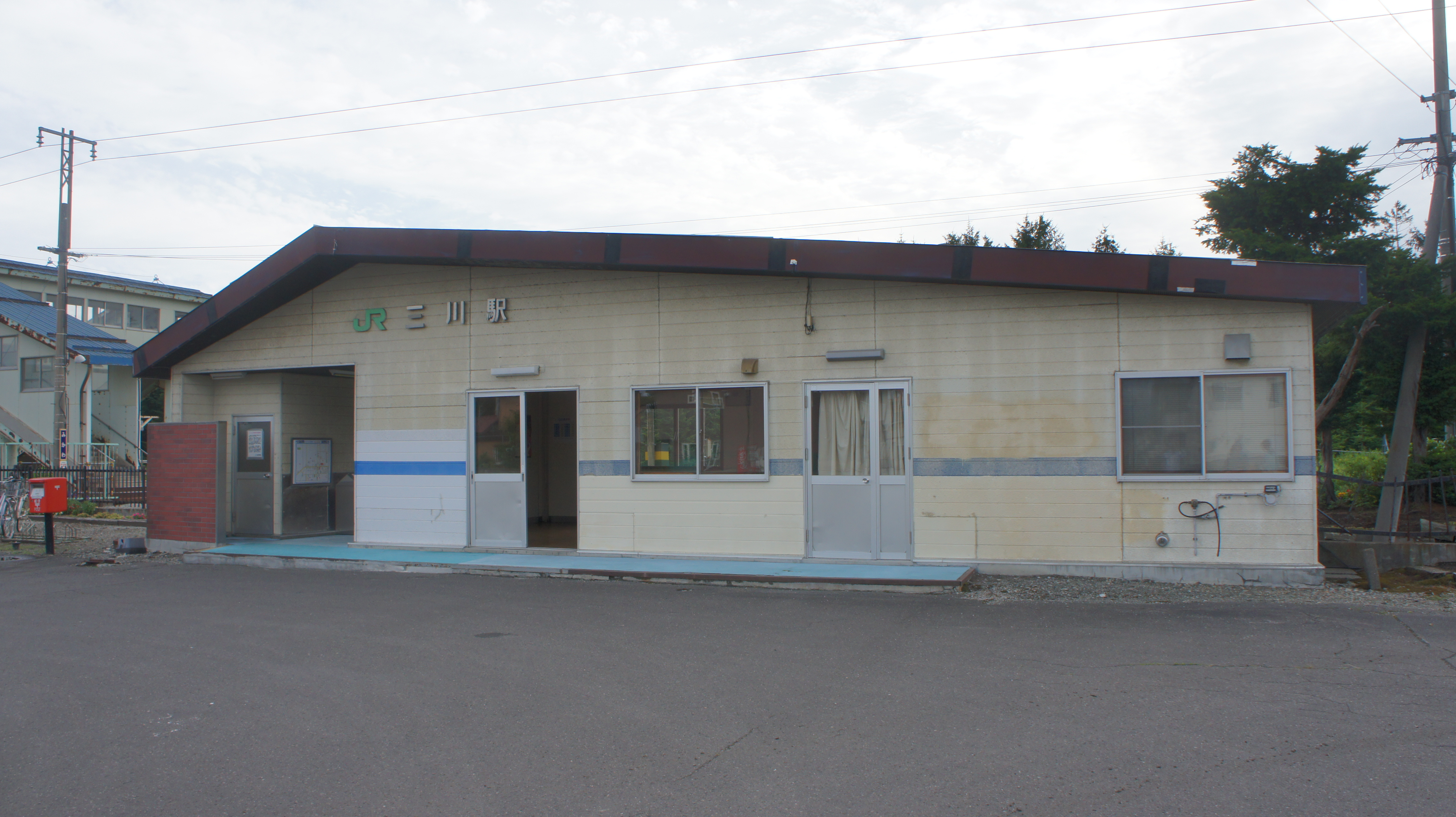
- Mikawa Station building in July 2017

General information
- Location: Yuni, Hokkaido; Japan
- Operator: JR Hokkaido
- Line: ■ Muroran Main Line
- Distance: 178.8 km from Oshamambe
- Platforms: 2 side platforms
- Tracks: 2

Other information
- Status: Unstaffed

History
- Opened: February 16, 1897
Location
- Location within Japan

Mikawa Station (三川駅, Mikawa-eki) is a railway station on the Muroran Main Line in Yuni, Yūbari District, Hokkaido, Japan. The station is operated by Hokkaido Railway Company (JR Hokkaido).

== Lines ==
Mikawa Station is served by the Muroran Main Line.

== Station layout ==
The station has two ground-level side platforms serving two tracks. The Kitaca farecard cannot be used at this station. The station is unattended.

=== Platforms ===
1	■ Muroran Main Line	for Oiwake and Tomakomai
2	■ Muroran Main Line	for Iwamizawa

== Adjacent stations ==
«	Service	»
Muroran Main Line
Oiwake (K15)	-	Furusan

== See also ==
- List of railway stations in Japan
