= Mount Hachimori (Yūbari) =

- 鉢盛山

Highest point
- Elevation: 1,453 m (4,767 ft)
- Listing: List of mountains and hills of Japan by height
- Coordinates: 43°11′52″N 142°17′3″E

Geography
- Location: On the border of Minamifurano, Yūbari, Hokkaidō, Japan
- Parent range: Yūbari Mountains
- Topo map(s): Geographical Survey Institute 25000:1 芦別岳; 50000:1 夕張岳

Mount Hachimori (鉢盛山, Hachimori-yama) is a mountain of the Yūbari Mountains on the border of Minamifurano, Yūbari, Hokkaidō, Japan. It is the source of the Yūbari River.
