= Furusan Station =

Railway station in Yuni, Hokkaido, Japan

Coordinates: 42.9756°N 141.7939°E

Furusan Station 古山駅
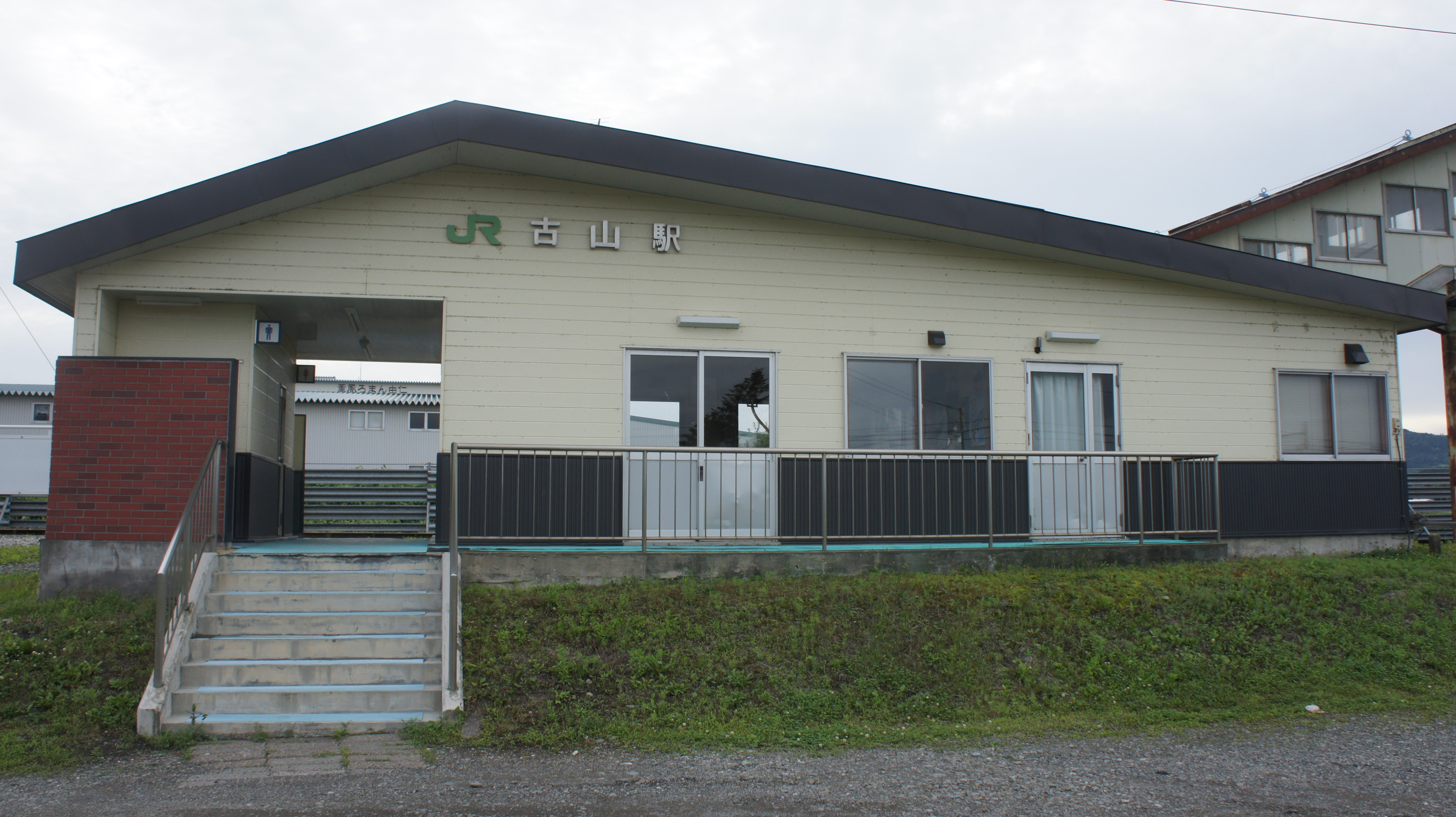
- The station building in July 2017

General information
- Location: Yuni, Hokkaido; Japan
- Operator: JR Hokkaido
- Line: ■ Muroran Main Line
- Distance: 182.2 km from Oshamambe
- Platforms: 2 side platforms
- Tracks: 2

Other information
- Status: Unstaffed

History
- Opened: September 25, 1943
Location
- Location within Japan

Furusan Station (古山駅, Furusan-eki) is a railway station on the Muroran Main Line in Yuni, Yūbari District, Hokkaido, Japan, operated by Hokkaido Railway Company (JR Hokkaido).

== Lines ==
Furusan Station is served by the Muroran Main Line.

== Station layout ==
The station has two ground-level opposed side platforms serving two tracks. Kitaca is not available. The station is unattended.

=== Platforms ===
1	■ Muroran Main Line	for Oiwake and Tomakomai
2	■ Muroran Main Line	for Iwamizawa

== Adjacent stations ==
«	Service	»
Muroran Main Line
Mikawa	-	Yuni

== See also ==
- List of railway stations in Japan
