= Yuny (disambiguation) =

Yuny may refer to:

- Yuny or Iuny, an ancient Egyptian official
- Yuny (viceroy of Kush), or Iuny, an ancient Egyptian official
- Yuny Han (born 1983), Korean actress
- Yuny railway station of the October Railway in St. Petersburg, Russia
- Yuny Strait, a sound in Severnaya Zemlya, Russia

== See also ==
- Yuni (disambiguation)
