= Yuni Station =

Railway station in Yuni, Hokkaido, Japan

Coordinates: 43.0121°N 141.7857°E

Yuni Station 由仁駅
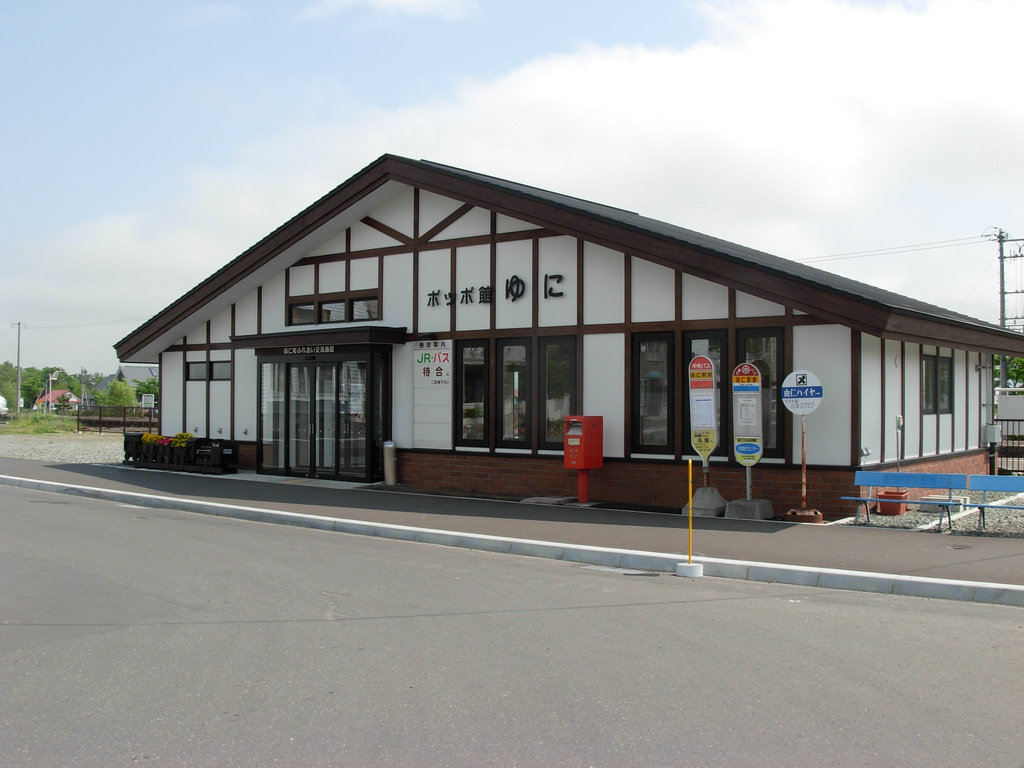
- Station building, June 2007

General information
- Location: Yuni, Hokkaido; Japan
- Operator: JR Hokkaido
- Line: ■ Muroran Main Line
- Distance: 186.4 km from Oshamambe
- Platforms: 2 side platforms
- Tracks: 2

Other information
- Status: Unstaffed

History
- Opened: August 1, 1892
Location

Yuni Station (由仁駅, Yuni-eki) is a train station in Yuni, Yūbari District, Hokkaidō, Japan.

== Lines ==
Yuni Station is served by the Muroran Main Line.

== Station layout ==
The station has two ground-level opposed side platforms serving two tracks. Kitaca is not available. The station is unattended.

=== Platforms ===
1	■ Muroran Main Line	for Iwamizawa
2	■ Muroran Main Line	for Oiwake and Tomakomai

== Adjacent stations ==
«	Service	»
Muroran Main Line
Furusan	-	Kuriyama
