= Mount Ashibetsu =

Mountain in the country of Japan

- 芦別岳
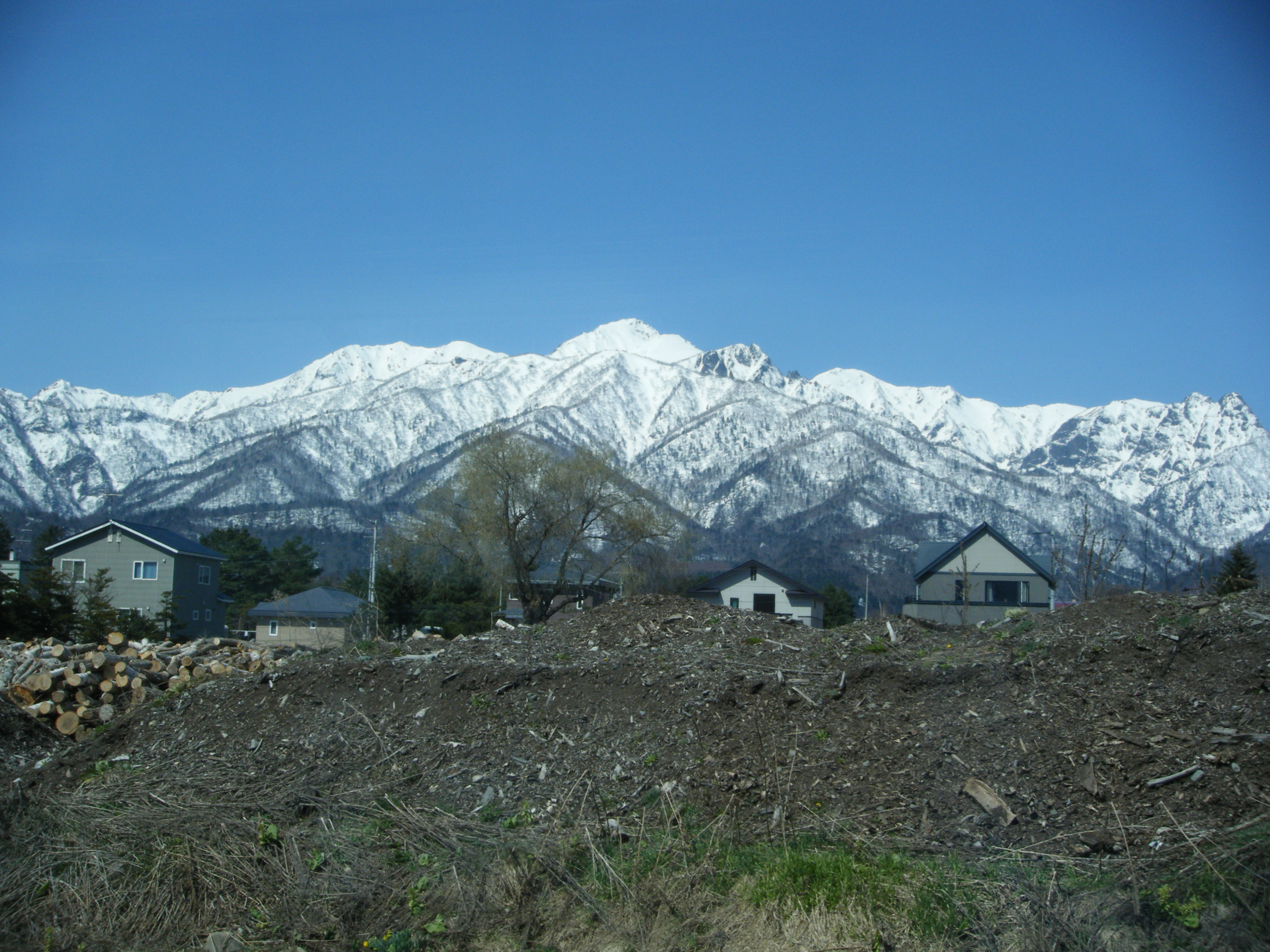
- Mount Ashibetsu from Yamabe Station in Furano (April 2009)

Highest point
- Elevation: 1,726.1 m (5,663 ft)
- Prominence: 1,208 m (3,963 ft)
- Listing: List of mountains and hills of Japan by height, Ribu
- Coordinates: 43°14′9″N 142°17′1″E

Naming
- Language of name: Japanese

Geography
- Location within Japan
- Location: Hokkaidō, Japan
- Parent range: Yūbari Mountains
- Topo map(s): Geospatial Information Authority 25000:1 芦別岳; 50000:1 夕張岳

Mount Ashibetsu (芦別岳, Ashibetsu-dake) is a mountain located on the border between Ashibetsu and Furano, Hokkaidō, Japan. It is part of the Yūbari Mountains.
