= Minami-Shimizusawa Station =

Former railway station in Yūbari, Hokkaido, Japan

Coordinates: 42°59′6.98″N 142°0′23.78″E

Minami-Shimizusawa Station 南清水沢駅
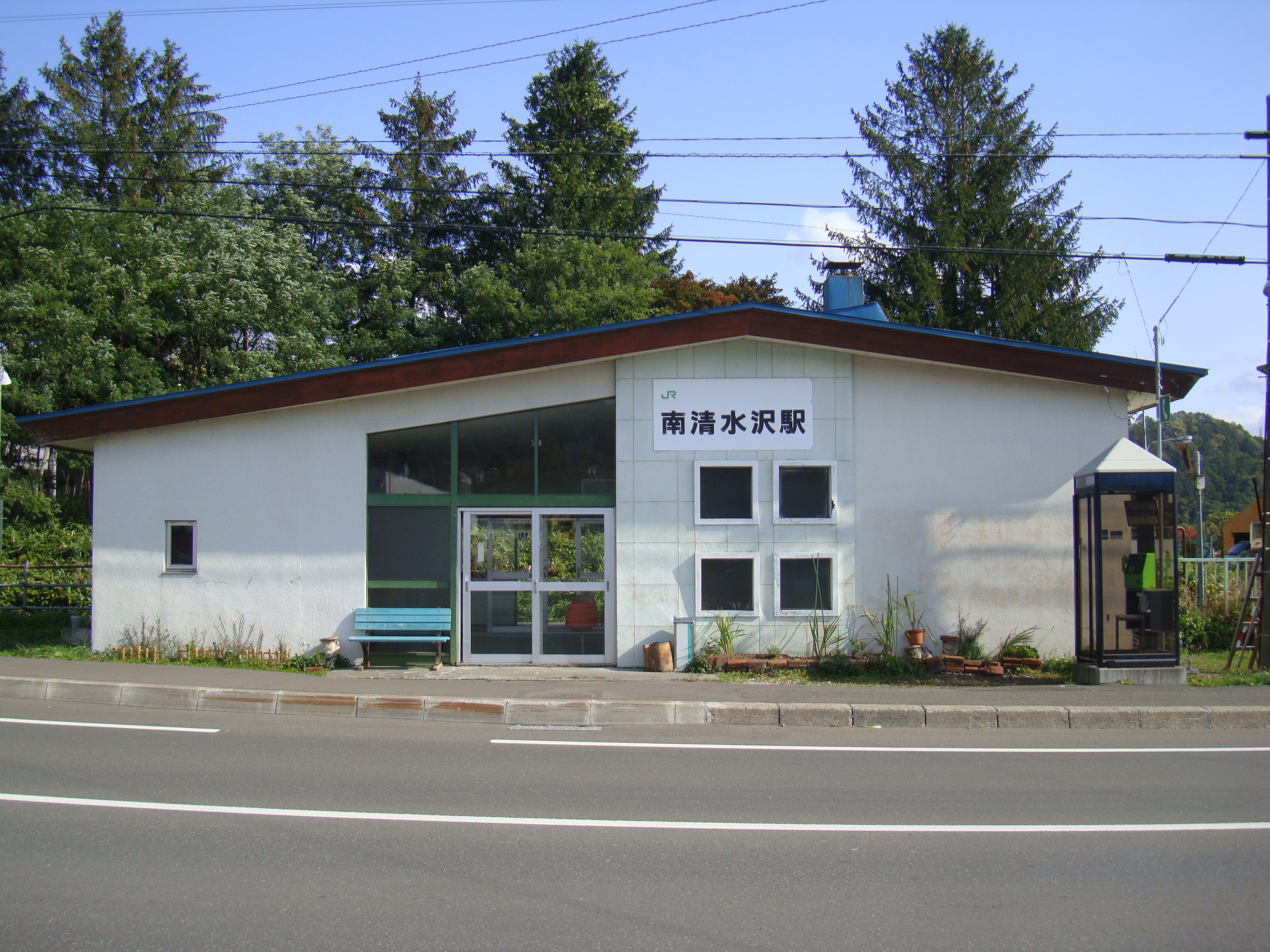

General information
- Location: Yūbari, Hokkaido; Japan
- Operator: JR Hokkaido
- Line: ■ Sekishō Line Yūbari Branch
- Distance: 6.7 km from Shin-Yūbari
- Platforms: 1 side platform
- Tracks: 1

Other information
- Status: Staffed
- Station code: Y22

History
- Opened: 25 December 1962
- Closed: 31 March 2019

Passengers
- FY1998: 128 daily
Location

Minami-Shimizusawa Station (南清水沢駅, Minami-Shimizusawa-eki) was a railway station in Yūbari, Hokkaidō, Japan. The station was closed when the Yubari Branch Line ceased operation on 31 March 2019.

== Lines ==
Minami-Shimizusawa Station was served by the Sekisho Line Yūbari Branch. The station was numbered "Y22".

== Station layout ==
The station had a ground-level side platform serving one track. Kitaca was not available.

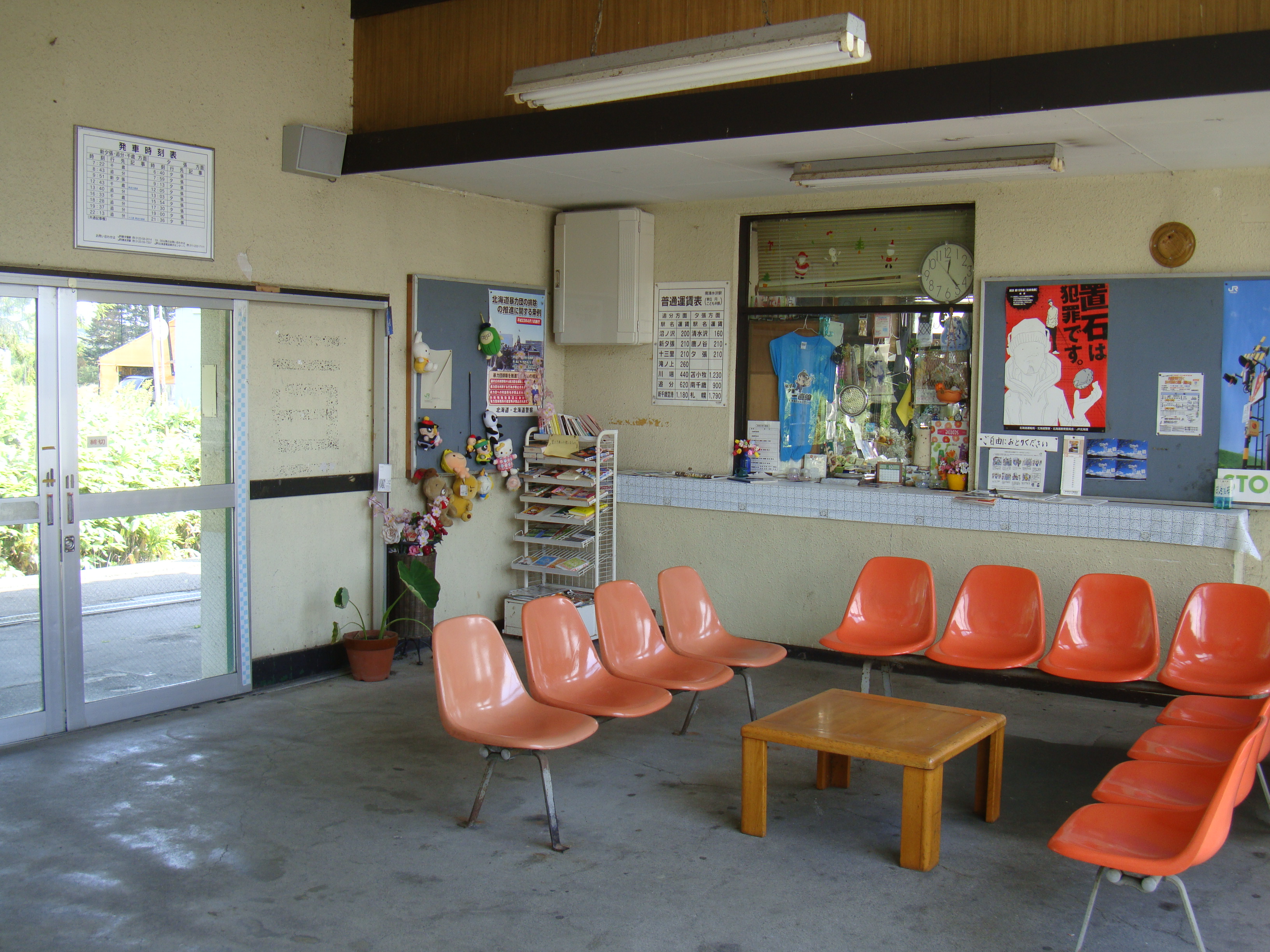
Inside the station

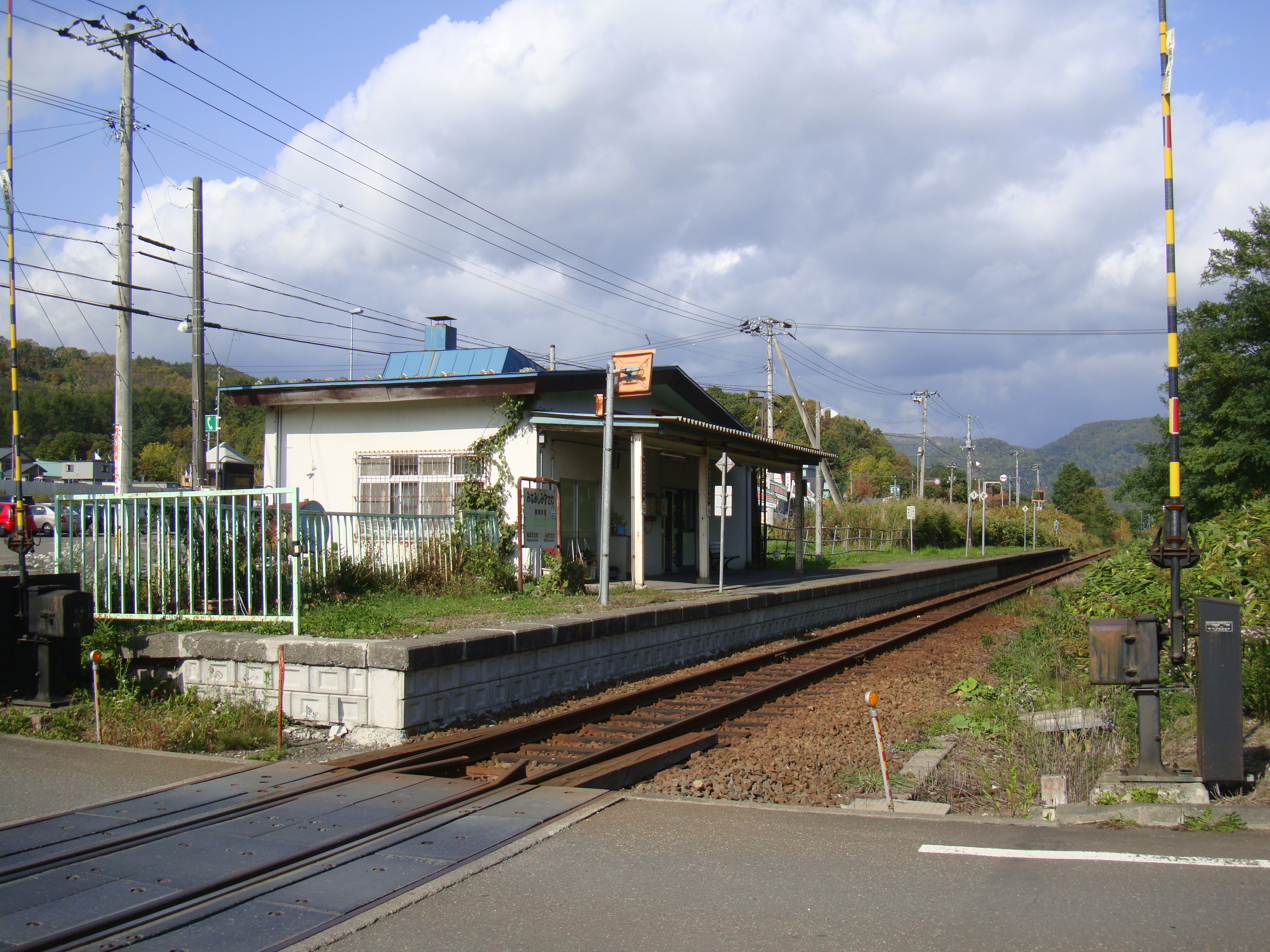
The platform

== Adjacent stations ==
«	Service	»
Sekisho Line Yūbari Branch
Numanosawa (Y21)	Local	Shimizusawa (Y23)

== Surrounding area ==
- National Route 452
