= Yuni, Hokkaido =

Yuni 由仁町
- Town
- Yuni Town
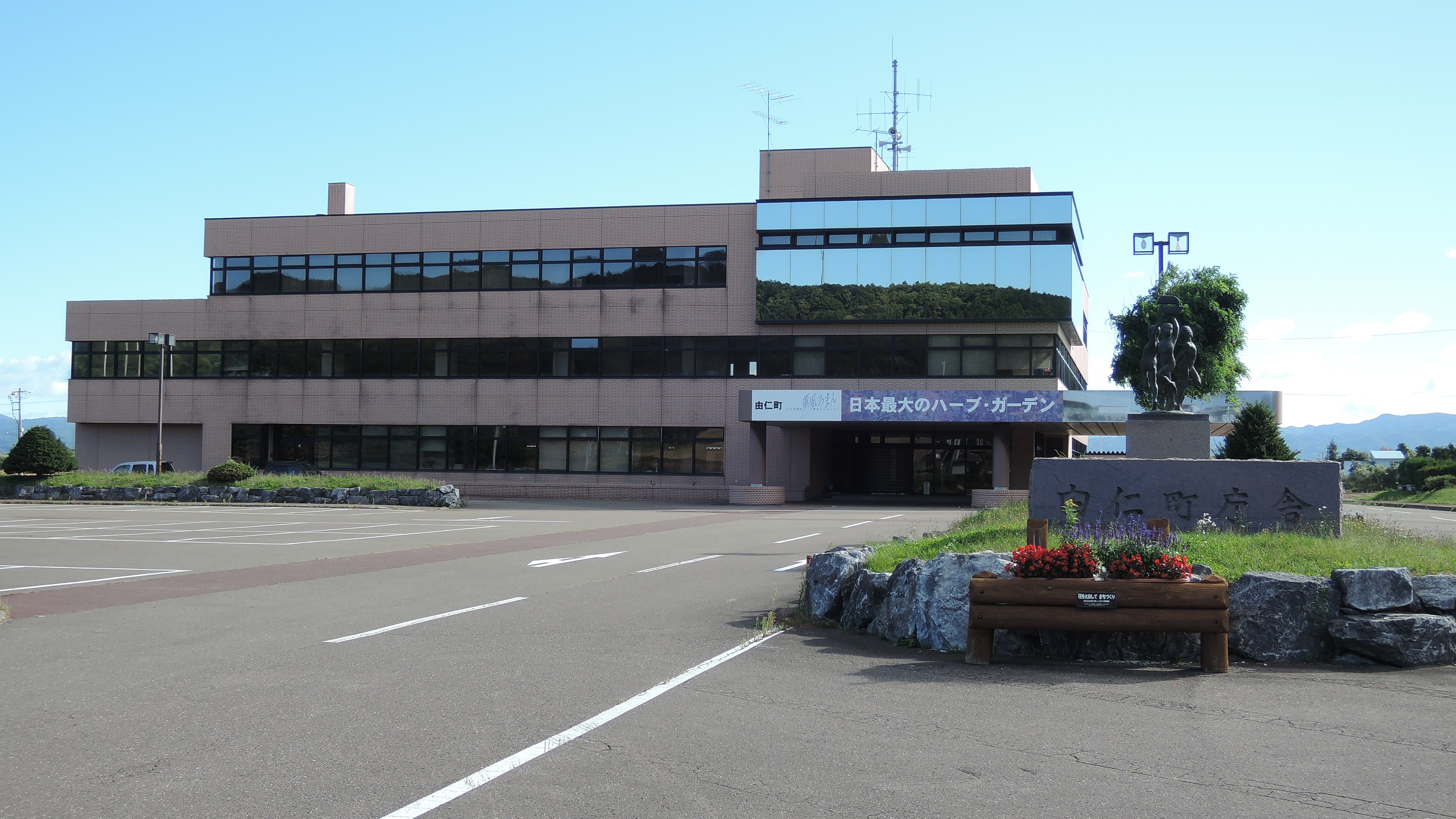
- Yuni Town hall

- Flag Seal

- Location of Yuni in Hokkaido (Sorachi Subprefecture)

- Location in Japan
- Coordinates: 43°0′N 141°47′E
- Country: Japan
- Region: Hokkaido
- Prefecture: Hokkaido (Sorachi Subprefecture)
- District: Yūbari

Area
  - Total: 133.86 km^{2} (51.68 sq mi)

Population (September 30, 2016)
  - Total: 5,426
  - Density: 40.53/km^{2} (105.0/sq mi)
- Time zone: UTC+09:00 (JST)
- Town Tree: Japanese Yew
- Town Flower: Chrysanthemum
- Website: www.town.yuni.lg.jp

Yuni (Japanese: 由仁町, Hepburn: Yuni-chō) is a town located in Sorachi Subprefecture, Hokkaido, Japan. It is located about 42 miles east of Sapporo. The Yarikirenai River is a famous location within Yuni.

The name Yuni comes from the Ainu word, ユウンニ (Yu-u-n-ni), meaning a "place with a hot springs."

In September 2016, the town had an estimated population of 5,426 and a density of 40.6 per square kilometre (105/sq mi). The total area is 133.86 square kilometres (51.68 sq mi).

== Geography ==
Yuni is the southernmost town in the Sorachi Subprefecture. The gourd-shaped town is 8 km from east to west at its widest point, and 32 kilometers from north to south at it its longest part. The Yubari River flows from the north to the south of the town. Located in the south-eastern part of Yuni are the forested area of the Yubari mountains. Located in the southern and western parts of Yuni are the Maoi Hills, which continue into Naganuma (長沼町). The eastern part of Yuni, which borders the town of Kuriyama (栗山町), are flat lowlands. The Yubari River flows along the border of the two towns. In the south-east of Yuni, the Yubari Mountain Range cuts through the forest.

- Rivers in Yuni: Yubari River, Yuni River, Yarikirenai River
- Mountains in Yuni: Yubari Mountains
- Hills in Yuni: Maoi Hills

=== Neighboring Municipalities ===
- Sorachi Subprefecture: Yubari, Kuriyama, Naganuma
- Ishikari Subprefecture: Chitose
- Iburi Subprefecture: Abira, Atsuma

== Economy ==
Yuni's primary industry is agriculture, however, recently the town has been trying to promote tourism by opening facilities such as botanical gardens.

Companies Located in Yuni

- 日本食品製造合資会社 三川工場 (Nihon Shokuhin Seizou Goushi Company, Mikawa Factory)
- クレードル興農株式会社 三川工場 (Cradle Kounou Co., Ltd., Mikawa Factory)
- 日本自動ドア株式会社 由仁工場 (Nihon Jidou door Co., Ltd., Yuni Factory)
- 小岩金網株式会社 由仁工場 (Koiwa Wire Mesh Co., Ltd., Yuni Factory)
- 共和コンクリート工業株式会社 由仁工場 (Kyowa Concrete Co., Ltd., Yuni Factory)
- 株式会社三英社製作所 (San Eisha Co., Ltd., Yuni Factory)

Agricultural Cooperative

- そらち南農業協同組合 (Sorachi Minami Agricultural Cooperative)

Financial Institutions

- 空知信用金庫由仁支店 (Sorachi Shinkin Bank, Yuni Branch Office)
- JAバンク北海道（北海道信用農業協同組合連合会）JAそらち南 由仁支所・三川出張所 (Hokkaido JA Bank (Hokkaido Agriculutral Cooperative Credit Union) JA Sorachi Minami Yuni Branch Office / Mikawa Branch Office)
- 由仁郵便局（北海道）ゆうちょ銀行 (Yuni Post Office (Hokkaido) Yucho Bank)
