= Shikanotani Station =

Former railway station in Yūbari, Hokkaido, Japan

Coordinates: 43°2′22.01″N 141°57′52.11″E

Shikanotani Station 鹿ノ谷駅
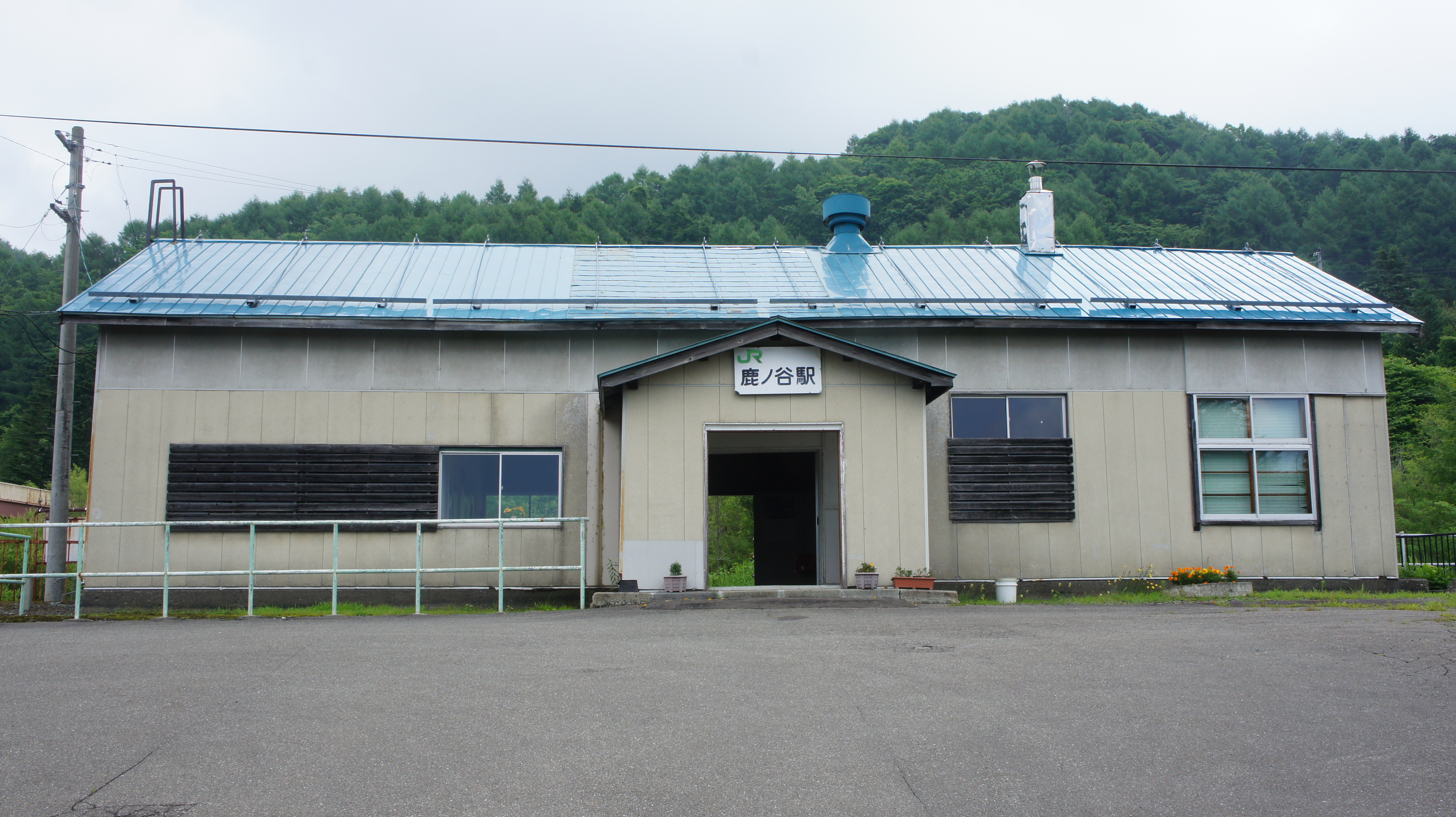

General information
- Location: Yūbari, Hokkaido; Japan
- Operator: JR Hokkaido
- Line: ■ Sekishō Line Yūbari Branch
- Distance: 14.8 km from Shin-Yūbari
- Platforms: 1 side platform
- Tracks: 1

Other information
- Status: Unstaffed
- Station code: Y24

History
- Opened: 1 December 1901
- Closed: 31 March 2019

Passengers
- FY1998: 48 daily
Location

Shikanotani Station (鹿ノ谷駅, Shikanotani-eki) was a railway station in Yūbari, Hokkaidō, Japan. The station was closed when the Yubari Branch Line ceased operation on 31 March 2019.

== Lines ==
Shikanotani Station was served by the Sekisho Line Yūbari Branch. The station was numbered "Y24".

== Station layout ==
The station had a ground-level side platform serving one track. Kitaca was not available. The station was unattended.

== Station ruins ==
As of April 2020, one year after the abolition, there were still overpasses across the station building and a large premises. In 2022, JR Hokkaido transferred it free of charge to Kanoya Station, a limited liability company established by citizens (represented by Hidekazu Hashiba).

== Adjacent stations ==
«	Service	»
Sekisho Line Yūbari Branch
Shimizusawa (Y23)	Local	Yūbari (Y25)
