= Japanese cruiser Yūbari =

Japanese naval vessel (1923–1944)

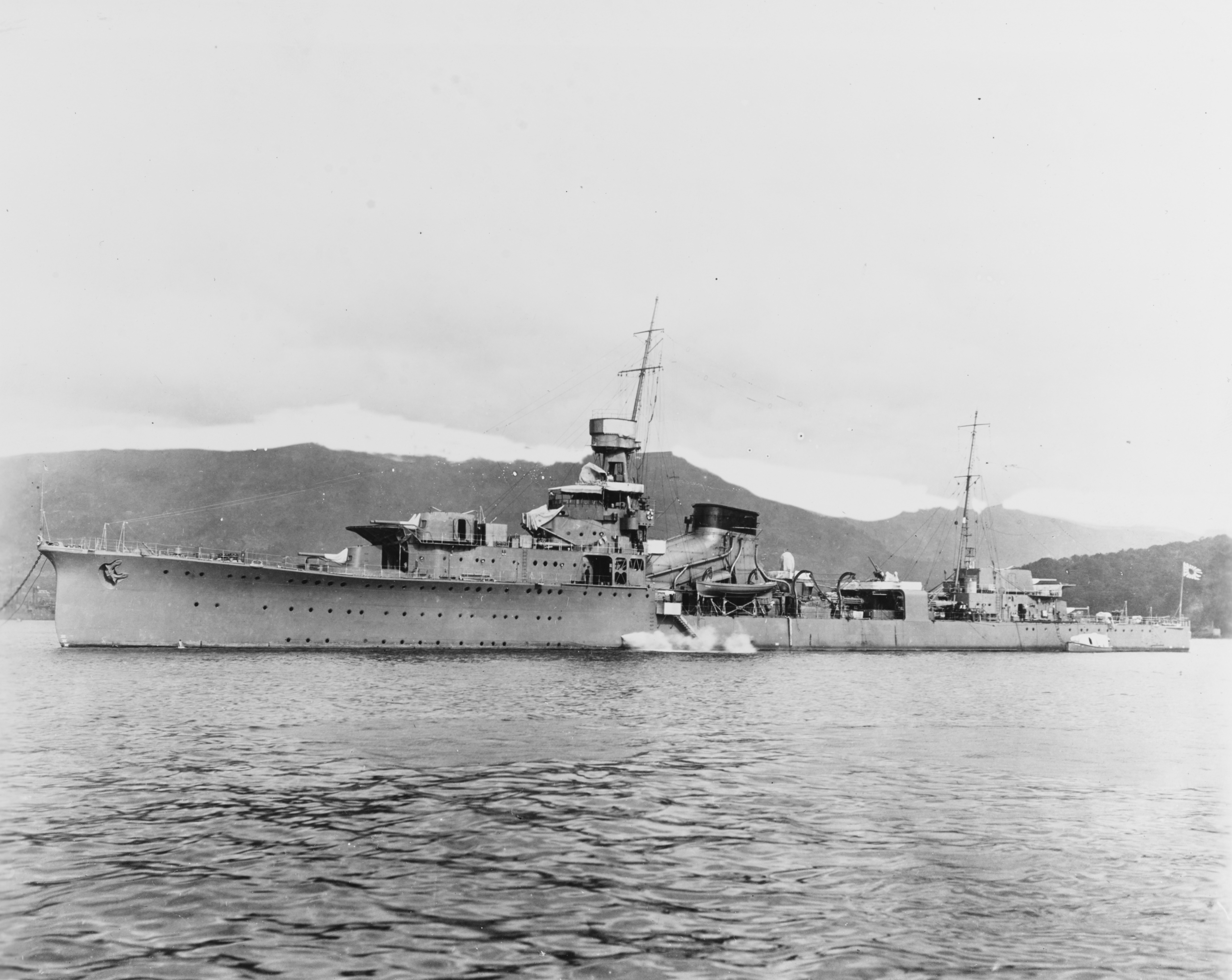
- Yūbari in 1924

History

Empire of Japan
- Name: Yūbari (夕張)
- Namesake: Yūbari River
- Ordered: October 1921
- Builder: Sasebo Naval Arsenal
- Laid down: 5 June 1922
- Launched: 5 March 1923
- Commissioned: 23 July 1923
- Fate: Torpedoed and sunk, 28 April 1944

General characteristics (as built)
- Type: Light cruiser
- Displacement: 3,560 long tons (3,620 t) (normal)
- Length: 139.45 m (457 ft 6 in) (o/a)
- Beam: 12.04 m (39 ft 6 in)
- Draft: 4.52 m (14 ft 10 in) (deep load)
- Installed power: 8 × water-tube boilers; 57,900 shp (43,200 kW)
- Propulsion: 3 × shafts; 3 × geared steam turbines
- Speed: 34.8 knots (64.4 km/h; 40.0 mph)
- Range: 3,310 nmi (6,130 km; 3,810 mi) at 14 knots (26 km/h; 16 mph)
- Complement: 328
- Armament: 2 × twin, 2 × single 14 cm (5.5 in) guns; 1 × single 76 mm (3 in) AA gun; 2 × twin 61 cm (24 in) torpedo tubes; 48 × mines; 1944: 2 × twin 14 cm guns; 1 × single 12 cm (4.7 in) AA gun; 6 × twin, 1 triple × 25 mm (1 in) AA guns; 2 × twin 61 cm torpedo tubes; 2 × depth charge launchers
- Armor: Belt: 38 mm (1.5 in); Deck: 25 mm (1 in); Turrets: 25 mm (1 in)

Yūbari (夕張) was an experimental light cruiser built during the early 1920s for the Imperial Japanese Navy (IJN) to test new concepts for reducing the hull's weight while strengthening it. Designs pioneered on Yūbari had a major impact on future Japanese warship designs. Completed in 1923, the ship was generally used as the flagship for destroyer squadrons. She spent large portions of her peacetime career in reserve or used as a training ship. The ship participated in the First Shanghai Incident in 1932 and the Second Sino-Japanese War in 1937 before World War II. During the war Yūbari was the flagship of the forces involved in the Battle of Wake Island and was then sent south to support the invasion of Rabaul in early 1942. She played a small role during the Battle of the Coral Sea as the flagship of the forces intended to invade Port Moresby, New Guinea. At the beginning of the Solomon Islands campaign, Yūbari escorted the forces that made the initial landings on the island of Guadalcanal in July. A few days after the Americans attacked the island in August, the ship participated in the Battle of Savo Island where she crippled an American heavy cruiser and a destroyer.

Yūbari spent the rest of the year on escort duties and she played a small role in the Battle of New Georgia in mid-1943 as she bombarded Allied forces a few days after they landed on the island. The ship struck a mine on the return journey and had to return to Japan for repairs that lasted for several months. After her return to the Guadalcanal area in November, she made several Tokyo Express runs to deliver reinforcements and supplies. Yūbari was damaged by several American airstrikes at Rabaul later that month and had to return again to Japan for repairs that lasted until March 1944. The ship was tasked to deliver supplies and troops to Japanese outposts in April and was sunk by an American submarine later that month.

== Background and description ==
Construction of an experimental light cruiser was authorized by the revised 1917 8-4 Fleet Program, but construction was not approved by the Naval General Staff until October 1921 to evaluate naval architect Captain Yuzuru Hiraga's innovative design proposal. He incorporated the ship's belt and deck armor plates as structural members into the hull structure, eliminating the weight of the traditional plating and structure that backed the armor. Hiraga believed that this would allow him to design a ship that would have the combat potential of the standard 5,500-long-ton (5,588 t) Sendai class light cruiser, but with a much lighter displacement. Lieutenant Commander Kikuo Fujimoto designed Yūbari, under the direction of Hiraga, to have nearly the same speed, armament and radius of action as the Sendais while displacing less than 60% of the older ships. Yūbari introduced numerous features that were adopted by subsequent heavy cruiser designs.

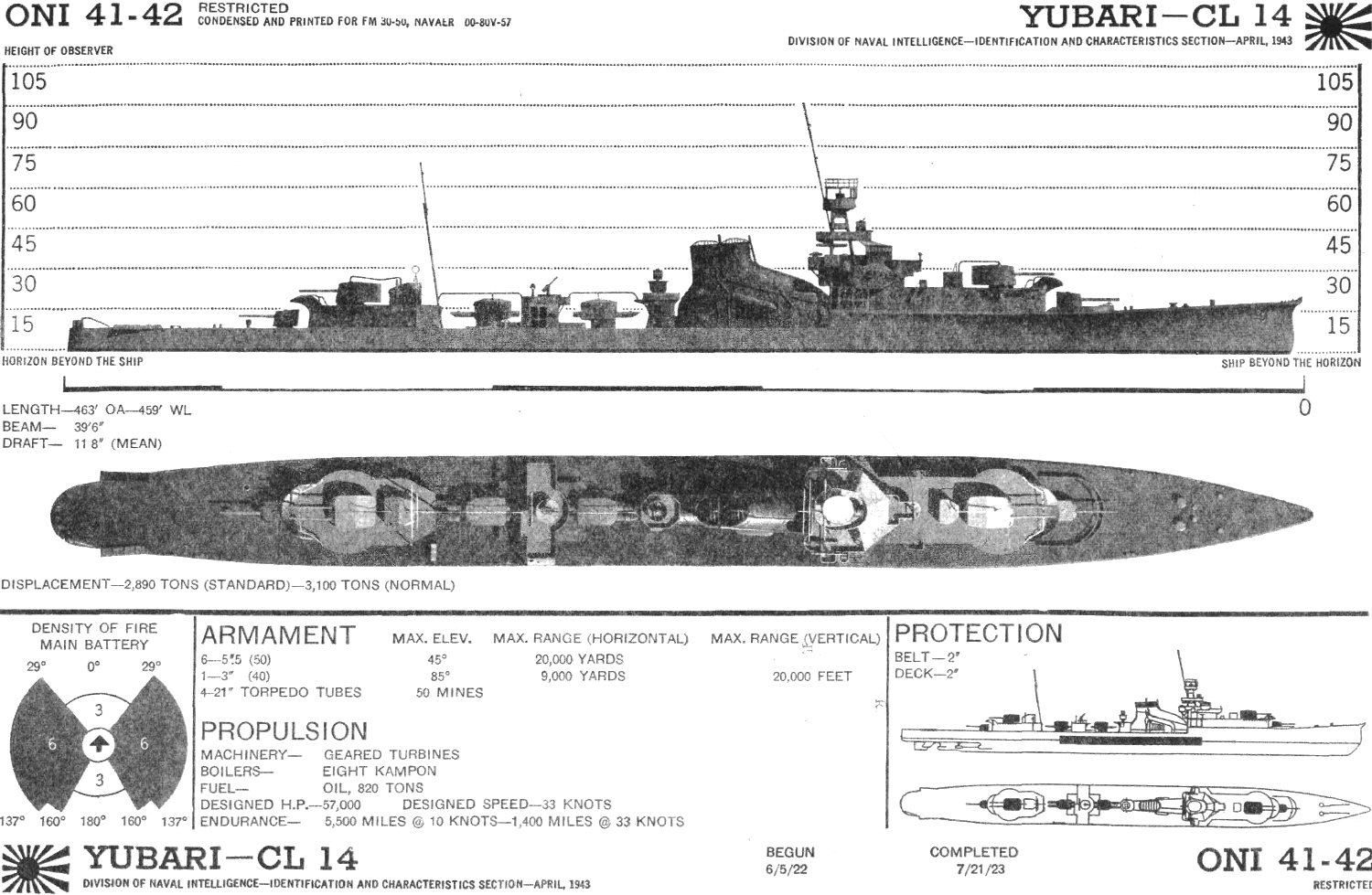
US Office of Naval Intelligence recognition drawings of Yūbari made during World War II

The cruiser was designed to displace 3,141 long tons (3,191 t) at normal load, but was significantly overweight for unknown reasons and actually displaced 3,560 long tons (3,617 t). She had an overall length of 139.45 meters (457 ft 6 in), a beam of 12.04 meters (39 ft 6 in), and a draft of 3.86 meters (12 ft 8 in), 0.34 meters (1 ft 1 in) deeper than designed. Her crew numbered 328 officers and enlisted men.

Yūbari's propulsion system was derived from that of the Minekaze-class destroyers, enlarged by one additional propeller shaft, steam turbine and four Kampon water-tube boilers. The three turbines used steam provided by eight boilers that operated at a pressure of 18.3 kg/cm^{2} (1,795 kPa; 260 psi) and a temperature of 156 °C (313 °F). The turbines developed a total of 57,900 shaft horsepower (43,200 kW) and were intended to give the cruiser a speed of 35.5 knots (65.7 km/h; 40.9 mph), but the increase in draft adversely affected both her speed and range. Yūbari only reached 34.8 knots (64.4 km/h; 40.0 mph) from 61,336 shp (45,738 kW), rather than her intended 35.5 knots (65.7 km/h; 40.9 mph), when the ship ran her sea trials on 5 July 1923. The ship carried a maximum of 916 tonnes (902 long tons) of fuel oil that gave her a range of 3,310 nautical miles (6,130 km; 3,810 mi), reduced from her designed range of 5,000 nmi (9,300 km; 5,800 mi), at 14 knots (26 km/h; 16 mph). Hiraga trunked the forward funnel aft into the rear funnel to minimize the effects of hot exhaust gases on the bridge personnel.

=== Armament and fire control ===
The cruiser's main battery consisted of six 50-caliber 14-centimeter (5.5 in) 3rd Year Type guns arranged in two twin-gun turrets and two single gun mounts protected by gun shields. One mount of each type was positioned forward and aft of the superstructure in a superfiring arrangement with the single mount positioned below the twin-gun turret. A pair of rotating Type 8 twin-tube mounts for 61-centimeter (24 in) torpedoes were located amidships on the ship's centerline. Each tube was provided with a single reload torpedo. A single 40-caliber 76-millimeter (3 in) 3rd Year Type anti-aircraft (AA) gun and two 7.7-millimeter (0.30 in) Lewis machine guns on a raised platform between the torpedo mounts for anti-aircraft defense. Yūbari was fitted with six rails at the stern that could accommodate 48 No. 1 naval mines in 24 compartments in the hull.

The main guns were controlled by a Type 13 director located at the top of the tripod mast. A pair of 3-meter (9 ft 10 in) rangefinders were located on the bridge, one on each broadside to determine the distance to the target.

=== Protection ===
A half-cross section of Yūbari's hull, showing the armor thicknesses

Incorporating the ship's armor plating into the hull reinforced the longitudinal strength of the hull, allowed Hiraga to eliminate the hull plates formerly installed behind the armor and the girders that traditionally provided the necessary longitudinal strength. This cut the weight of the Yūbari's displacement devoted to the hull to 31.2 percent from the roughly 38 percent of the Sendai class and permitted Hiraga to substantially increase the amount of Yūbari's armor protection. The ship was fitted with 349 tonnes (343 long tons) of armor, almost exactly double the weight in the Sendai-class ships.

Yūbari's armor was designed to protect against American 4-inch (102 mm) shells and the cruiser was equipped with an internal waterline 38-millimeter (1.5 in) New Vickers Non-Cemented (NVNC) armor belt that sloped outwards 10° from top to bottom. The belt was 4.15 meters (13 ft 7 in) high, had a length of 57.91 meters (190 ft), and connected to the armored deck at the top and the double bottom below. Forming the top of the armored citadel, the deck had 25.4-millimeter-thick (1 in) NVNC armor plates that were reinforced by 22-millimeter (0.87 in) plates of high-tensile steel along the centerline. The boiler uptakes were protected up to a height of 0.76 meters (2 ft 6 in) by NVNC plates 32 millimeters (1.3 in) thick.

=== Modifications ===
In 1924, the funnel was raised by 2 meters (6 ft 7 in) to further reduce the amount of exhaust gases reaching the bridge and fire-control director at high speed. Additional ballast was also added to increase stability. During her 1932–1933 refit, the 76 mm AA gun was removed and the torpedo mounts were raised and received spray shields. The following year, Yūbari's mine storage equipment was removed, her hull girders reinforced and ballast installed during a refit from 17 May to 20 July 1934 after the top-heavy Japanese torpedo boat Tomozuru capsized during a storm. In 1935, a twin mount for 13.2-millimeter (0.52 in) Type 93 machine guns was fitted where the 76 mm AA gun had been and splinter plating was installed around the portions of the bridge. The 13.2 mm machine gun mount was replaced by four 2.5-centimeter (1 in) Type 96 AA guns in twin mounts in 1940.

Shortly after the start of the Pacific War, Yūbari had a pair of improvised twin-gun mounts for 13.2 mm machine guns installed on either side of her bridge. These were replaced by Type 96 AA guns in February 1943. Six months later the aft single 14 cm mount was replaced by a triple mount for Type 96 AA guns. Yūbari also received a Type 22 surface-search radar, a Type 93 Mk.4 sonar system and a Type 93 hydrophone set. The ship had a significant refit in early 1944 when the forward single 14 cm gun was replaced by a 45-caliber 12 cm (4.7 in) AA gun, two additional triple and eight single mounts for Type 96 AA guns were installed. Two depth charge racks were also added, each with six depth charges.

== Construction and career ==
Yūbari, named after the Yūbari River, was laid down on 5 June 1922 at the Sasebo Naval Arsenal, launched on 5 March 1923 and completed, and commissioned on 31 July 1923, under the command of Captain Masao Sugiura. Completed just prior to the 1923 Great Kantō earthquake on 1 September, Yūbari was quickly pressed into service to help evacuate refugees from the Shinagawa area. Crown Prince Hirohito boarded the vessel for a tour from Yokohama to Yokosuka on 10 October. The ship was transferred to the 3rd Cruiser Division of the 1st Fleet on 1 December and Masao was replaced by Captain Yamaguchi Nobuichi. Accompanied by the light cruisers Tama and Isuzu, Yūbari cruised off the Chinese coast in March 1924. After serving as the flagship for a destroyer squadron during the annual fleet maneuvers in late 1924, she was placed in reserve on 1 December.

Yūbari made a lengthy cruise during April–June 1925 in the Western Pacific, including a visit to Australia, and observed the fleet exercises of the United States Navy west of the Hawaiian Islands. The ship was based in Japanese Taiwan in August–November and then became flagship of the 1st Destroyer Squadron of the 1st Fleet on 1 December. Twelve months later she was transferred to the 2nd Destroyer Squadron of the 2nd Fleet where her squadron exercised in Taiwanese waters during March–April 1927 and was assigned to the Combined Fleet during the Special Great Maneuvers held near the Ryukyu and Bonin Islands. Yūbari was placed in reserve on 1 December and was attached to the Imperial Japanese Naval Academy as a training ship until mid-1931. She was refitted at the Sasebo Naval Arsenal from 4 September to 23 January 1932.

During her refit, Yūbari was transferred to the 1st Fleet and was assigned as the flagship of the 1st Destroyer Squadron on 1 December 1931. The cruiser and her destroyers was ordered to Shanghai, China, on 26 January after the staged rioting had begun that prefaced the First Shanghai Incident. The squadron escorted troopships carrying Imperial Japanese Army troops past Chinese forts at the mouth of the Huangpu River in Wusong on 8 February. After the troops had disembarked, the squadron began bombarding the forts as the troops assaulted them and nearby Chinese positions in the Zhabei and Hongkou Districts through the following day. The muzzle blast from her own guns damaged Yūbari and she repaired at the Sasebo Naval Arsenal from 22 March to 31 January 1933. The squadron made a training cruise off the Chinese coast in July–August and participated in a naval review at Yokohama on 25 August. She was reduced to reserve on 13 November and was assigned to the Sasebo Guard Squadron when it was formed on 11 December.

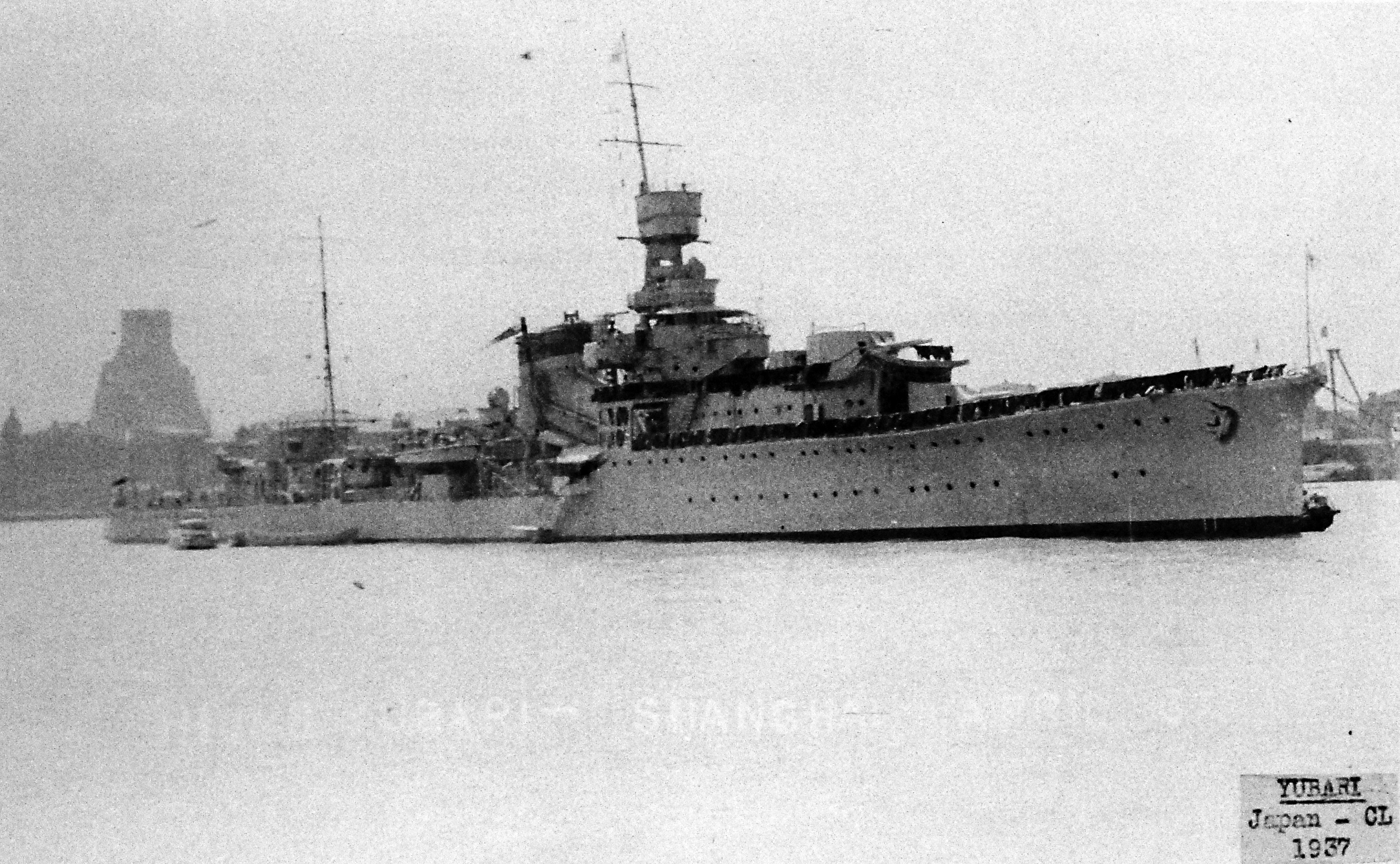
Yubari in 1937

On 15 November 1934, Captain Tadashige Daigo assumed command, and Yūbari was reassigned to the Yokosuka Guard Squadron of the Yokosuka Naval District, where she was refitted 9 July–15 November 1935. Afterwards, she was assigned to the 5th Destroyer Squadron of the 3rd Fleet and conducted patrols off of the China coast and visiting the island of Java in the Dutch East Indies in 1936. With the start of the Second Sino-Japanese War in August 1937, Yūbari assisted in the evacuation of Japanese civilians from coastal cities in southern China. On 14 September Yūbari and the destroyers Hayate and Oite were entering the Pearl River Delta at Bocca Tigris when they encountered the elderly protected cruiser Chao Ho and the sloop Hai Chow (formerly the Arabis class HMS Pentstemon). The Japanese ships engaged the Chinese ones and the forts defending the area with little effect and both sides retreated. As Yūbari steamed back to base, she was attacked by Northrop A-17 light bombers of the Chinese Air Force. Although the ship was not struck, near misses wounded five sailors. Subsequently, she was sent north to cover landings by the Imperial Japanese Army at Hangzhou on 20 October.

The cruiser was replaced by the light cruiser Nagara as the flagship of the 5th Destroyer Squadron on 1 December and was reduced to reserve at Yokosuka on 7 December before beginning a refit that lasted from 14 January–31 March 1938. Yūbari remained in reserve until November 1940, with the exceptions of two brief periods of active duty with the Ōminato Guard District in 1939. During one of these she patrolled off the coast of Sakhalin Island north of the Japanese Home Islands. In early 1940 her 13.2 mm machine guns were replaced by two twin-gun mounts for 25 mm weapons. On 15 November Yūbari became flagship of the 6th Destroyer Squadron, commanded by Rear Admiral Sadamichi Kajioka, of the 4th Fleet, tasked with the defense of the South Seas Mandate. The ship cruised the Western Pacific between 2 February and 14 April 1941, visiting Saipan Island, the Palau Islands, Truk and Kwajalein Atoll. She was briefly refitted at Yokohama 20 April–1 May and departed Japan for a tour of the Mandated Islands on 25 May that lasted until she began training at Truk on 25 October. The cruiser and her flotilla arrived at Kwajalein on 3 December having already received the code phrase "Climb Mount Niitaka" which set the date for the declaration of war on the United States by the Japanese as 8 December (Japanese time).

=== The Pacific War ===
Yūbari was the flagship for the Japanese invasion force during the invasion of Wake Island. Kajioka's ships began bombarding the shore with little effect on the morning of 11 December, but the island's USMC defenders sank two destroyers, damaged two others as well as a light cruiser, forcing Kajoika to withdraw to Kwajalein. Yūbari was bracketed by gunfire, but took no damage. Kajoika's force was heavily reinforced and took the island on 23 December.

While preparing for subsequent operations, Yūbari's anti-aircraft suite was reinforced by two pairs of Type 93 machine guns, one on each side of the bridge on 3 January 1942. The 6th Destroyer Squadron then spent the next several months escorting the forces involved in the capture of Rabaul and Kavieng, New Ireland, off the coast of New Guinea on 23–24 January, followed by the Invasion of Salamaua–Lae on 8 March. This was interrupted by an unsuccessful attempt to intercept the American aircraft carrier group centered around the USS Lexington on 20 February. On 10 March, she was attacked by two Douglas SBD-3 Dauntless dive bombers from the Lexington, which scored two near-misses that killed a number of her anti-aircraft gun crews. She was then strafed by four Grumman F4F-3 Wildcat fighters from Lexington, which killed her executive officer and several crewmen on her bridge. The following morning she was attacked again by aircraft from USS Yorktown. Yorktown's Dauntlesses detonated gunpowder bags near her forward twin-gun turret, causing a fire, and a Wildcat strafing run detonated gasoline drums stored in her port lifeboat. Firefighting teams found the fire hoses too short and the large fire threatened the forward torpedo mount. Captain Ban Masami ordered the torpedoes jettisoned, but the mount could not rotate due to a power failure, forcing the crew to use pulleys and ropes to dump the torpedoes manually. During this battle Yūbari evaded 67 bombs and 12 torpedoes, suffering 13 killed and 49 wounded. She was bombed again on 20 March by four USAAF B-17 Flying Fortress bombers while returning to Rabaul with four near-misses that opened three holes in her stern. She returned to Truk for emergency repairs on 25 March. These were completed, together with the addition of more splinter armor for the bridge, on 10 April.

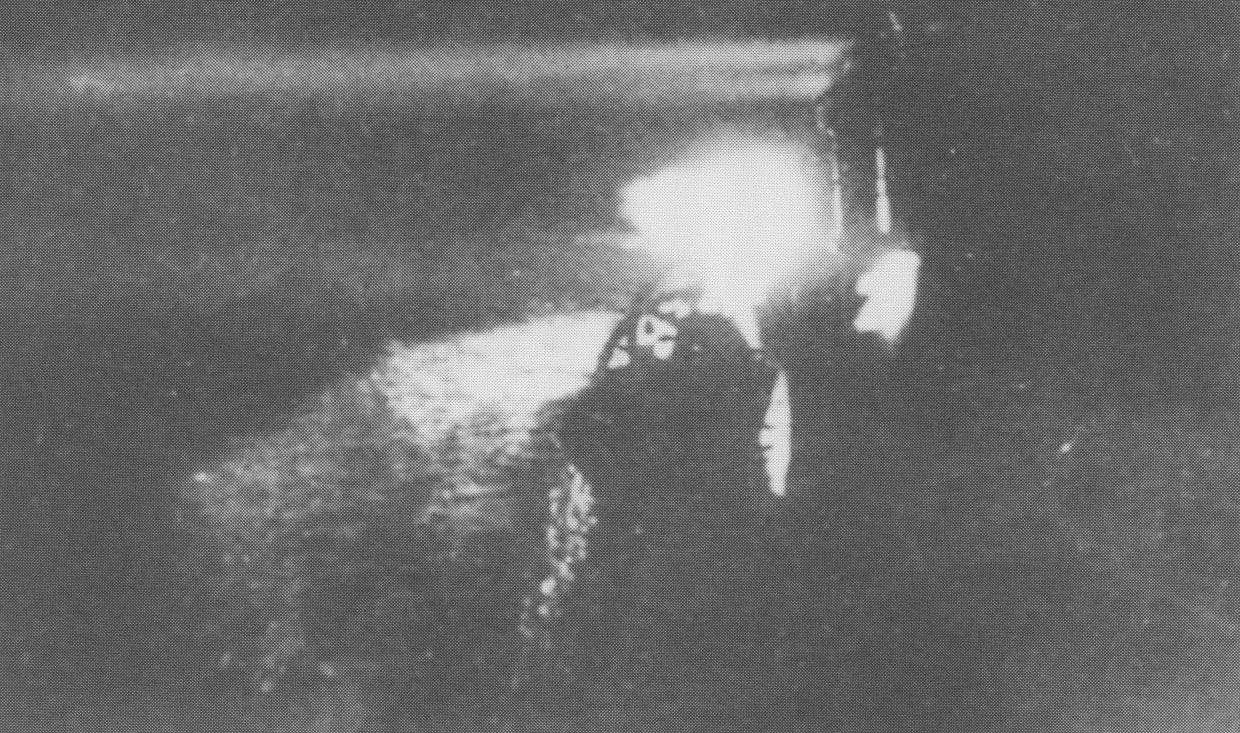
Yūbari shining her searchlights on the allied northern force during the night battle around Savo Island, August 9, 1942.

Yūbari was next assigned as the flagship of the Port Moresby Attack Force during Operation MO on 4 May. On 7 May she escaped an attack by four B-17 bombers without damage and unsuccessfully searched for survivors from the light carrier Shōhō, which had been sunk earlier. She returned to Truk on 17 May when the operation was cancelled following the Battle of the Coral Sea. She returned to Yokosuka to receive permanent repairs that lasted from 19 May to 19 June.

Beginning on 29 June 1942, Yūbari took part in the Solomon Islands campaign, including landing personnel on Guadalcanal to construct an airfield. The 6th Destroyer Squadron was disbanded on 10 July and the cruiser was reassigned to No. 2 Surface Escort Force of the 4th Fleet at Truk. She was transferred to Rabaul on 17 July and began to develop problems with her center turbine around that time that limited her to 26 knots (48 km/h; 30 mph) on two shafts. Yūbari played a limited role in the Battle of Savo Island on 9 August, putting one torpedo into the heavy cruiser USS Vincennes that knocked out her remaining fire room and crippled the destroyer USS Ralph Talbot with five 14 cm hits. The ship fired 96 main-gun rounds and four torpedoes during the battle. Yūbari escorted the landing force for Operation RY, the occupation of Nauru and Ocean Islands, departing Truk on 26 August and returned there on 5 September. Starting on 10 September, she began making patrols and escorted convoys between Truk and the Marshall Islands, Gilbert Islands, and Palau. She was based at Tarawa from 20 October to 20 November as a guard ship.

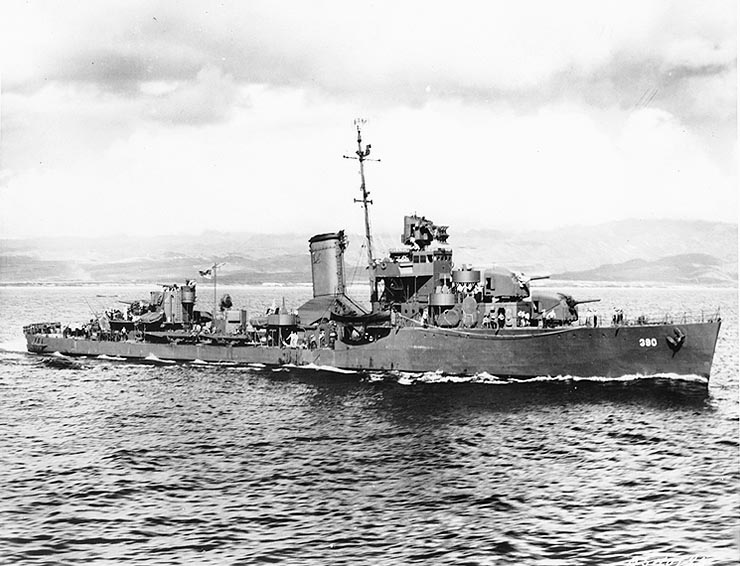
The American destroyer Ralph Talbot in January 1943 after being repaired. She was heavily damaged after attempting to duel with Yūbari off Savo Island on August 9, 1942.

She returned to Yokosuka in early December, where her middle turbine was repaired and additional anti-aircraft weaponry was installed in February 1943. She returned to Rabaul on 1 April and was assigned to the Southwest Area Fleet. On 2 July, Yūbari and her destroyers bombarded the American beachhead established at Rendova Island, but with little effect. On her return to Buin, Yūbari struck a naval mine laid by a Grumman TBM Avenger torpedo bomber, it damaged her bow, limited her speed to 22 knots (41 km/h; 25 mph) and wounded 26 crewmen. She received emergency repairs when she reached Rabaul and departed for Yokosuka on 16 July for permanent repairs. These gave the IJN the opportunity to further augment her anti-aircraft suite and install radar and sonar systems. The ship returned to Rabaul on 3 November. She rescued 196 troops and three artillery pieces from the damaged transport Kiyosumi Maru on the 4th. The next day Yūbari was assigned as the flagship of the 3rd Destroyer Squadron. On 6 November, she undertook a "Tokyo Express" transport run with 700 troops from the IJA 17th Division and 25 tons of supplies to Bougainville Island. Yūbari was damaged slightly by a strafing attack in the 11 November Carrier Raid on Rabaul, and again on 14 November. On 18 November, she attempted another troop transport run to Garove Island in New Britain, but the mission was cancelled after Yūbari was damaged in an attack by USAAF B-24 Liberators and USN PBY Catalinas. The ship received emergency repairs when she returned to Rabaul on 24 November. She departed on 3 December, towing the Naganami to Truk where they arrived on the 8th. The cruiser returned to Yokosuka on 19 December for repairs and the installation of depth charge launchers and still more anti-aircraft guns. She returned to Saipan on 30 March 1944, and Palau on 25 April

Yūbari was sighted on 27 April 1944 off Palau by the American submarine Bluegill on her first war patrol. Bluegill fired six torpedoes, of which Yūbari managed to evade five, but the one hit flooded both fire rooms at 10:04. She attempted to get underway using only her middle shaft after 1400, but the attempt failed, as did an attempt by the accompanying destroyer Samidare to take her in tow later in the day. Yūbari sank almost 24 hours after being torpedoed, at position 05°20′N 132°16′E, with the loss of 19 crewmen. She was stricken from the navy list on 10 June 1944.
