= Furano-Ashibetsu Prefectural Natural Park =

Prefectural natural park in the country of Japan

Coordinates: 43.2358°N 142.2836°E

- 富良野芦別道立自然公園
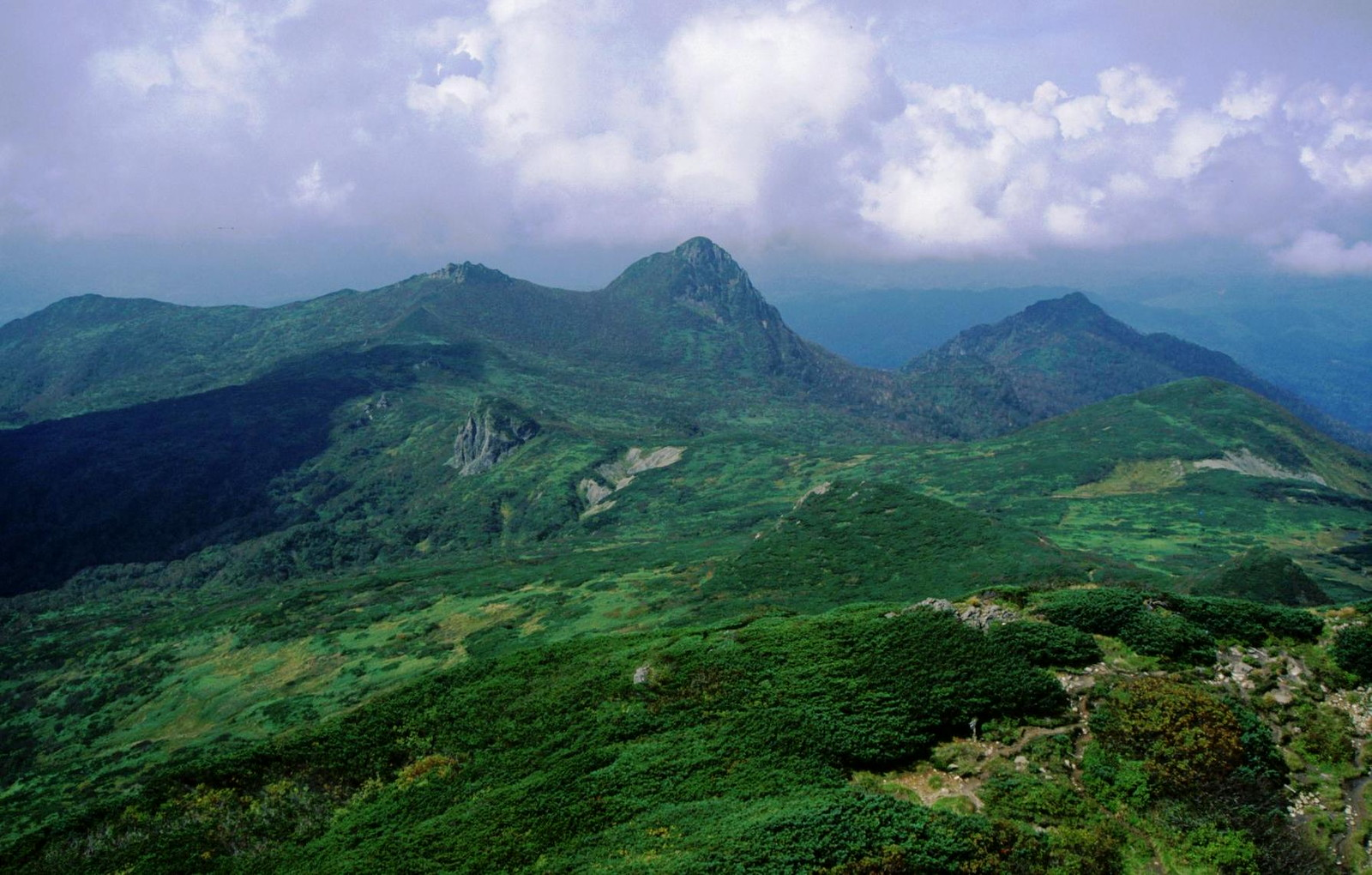
- Mount Yubari
- Interactive map of Furano-Ashibetsu Prefectural Natural Park
- Location: Hokkaidō, Japan
- Area: 357.56 km^{2} (138.05 sq mi)
- Established: 1955

Furano-Ashibetsu Prefectural Natural Park (富良野芦別道立自然公園, Furano-Ashibetsu dōritsu shizen kōen) is a Prefectural Natural Park in central Hokkaidō, Japan. Established as a Prefectural Park in 1955 and redesignated a Prefectural Natural Park in 1958, the park spans the municipalities of Ashibetsu, Furano, Mikasa, Minamifurano, and Yūbari.

== See also ==
- National Parks of Japan
- Lake Akkeshi
