= Mount Yūbari =

Mountain near Minamifurano, Hokkaidō, Japan

- 夕張岳
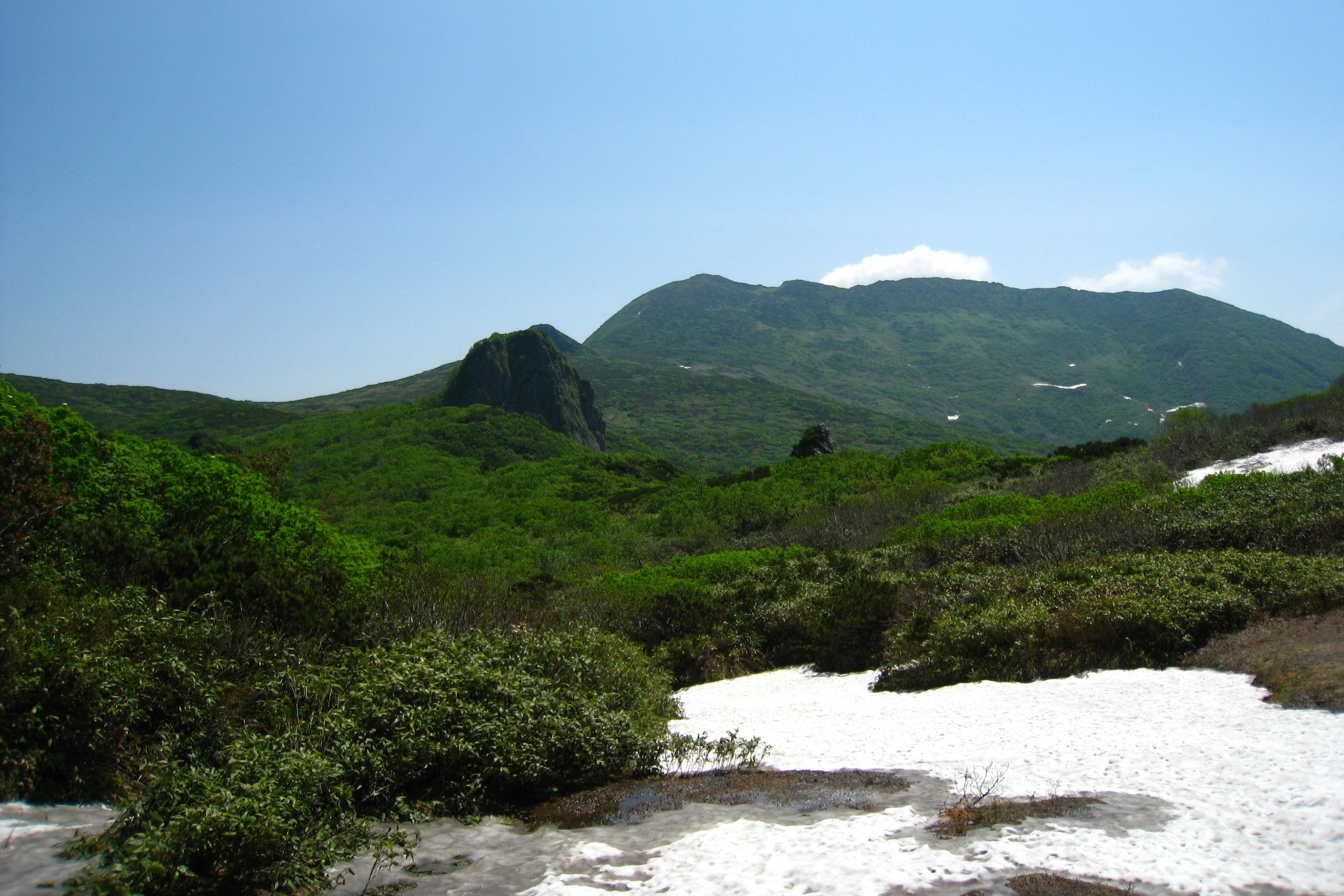

Highest point
- Elevation: 1,667.7 m (5,471 ft)
- Listing: List of mountains and hills of Japan by height
- Coordinates: 43°5′58.92″N 142°15′3.66″E

Geography
- Location: On the border of Minamifurano, Yūbari, Hokkaido, Japan
- Parent range: Yūbari Mountains
- Topo map(s): Geographical Survey Institute 25000:1 夕張岳; 50000:1 夕張岳

Mount Yūbari (夕張岳, Yūbari-dake) is a mountain of the Yūbari Mountains. It is located on the border of Minamifurano, Yūbari, Hokkaido, Japan.
