= Yūbari Station =

Former railway station in Yūbari, Hokkaido, Japan

Coordinates: 43.0509288°N 141.9674134°E

Yūbari Station 夕張駅
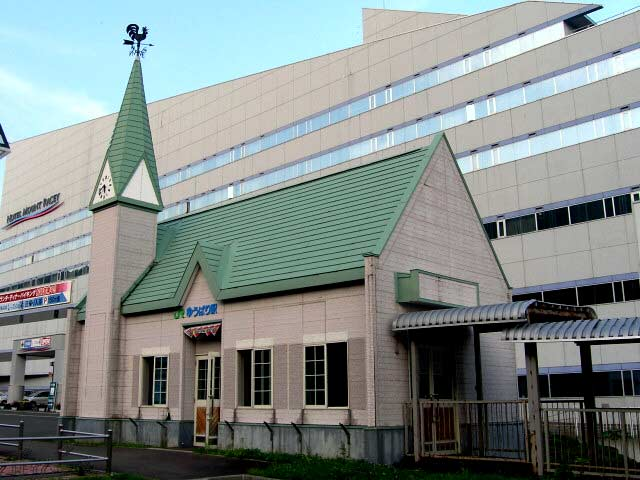
- Yubari Station in July 2004

General information
- Location: Yūbari, Hokkaido; Japan
- Operator: JR Hokkaido
- Line: ■ Sekisho Line Yūbari Branch
- Distance: 16.1 km from Shin-Yūbari
- Platforms: 1 side platform
- Tracks: 1
- Connections: Bus stop

Other information
- Status: Unstaffed
- Station code: Y25

History
- Opened: 1 November 1892
- Closed: 31 March 2019

Passengers
- FY1998: 62 daily
Location
- Location within Japan

Yūbari Station (夕張駅, Yūbari-eki) was a railway station on the Sekishō Line in Yūbari, Hokkaido, Japan, operated by Hokkaido Railway Company (JR Hokkaido). Yūbari Station opened on 1 November 1892. With the privatization of Japanese National Railways (JNR) on 1 April 1987, the station came under the control of JR Hokkaido. The station was closed when the Yubari Branch Line ceased operation on 31 March 2019.

== Lines ==
Yūbari Station was the terminus of the 18.2 km Yūbari branch of the Sekishō Line. The station was numbered "Y25". but following the closure, it no longer appears on JR Hokkaido rail maps.

== Station layout ==
The station consisted of a single ground-level side platform serving a terminating track. The Kitaca farecard could not be used at this station. The station was unattended.

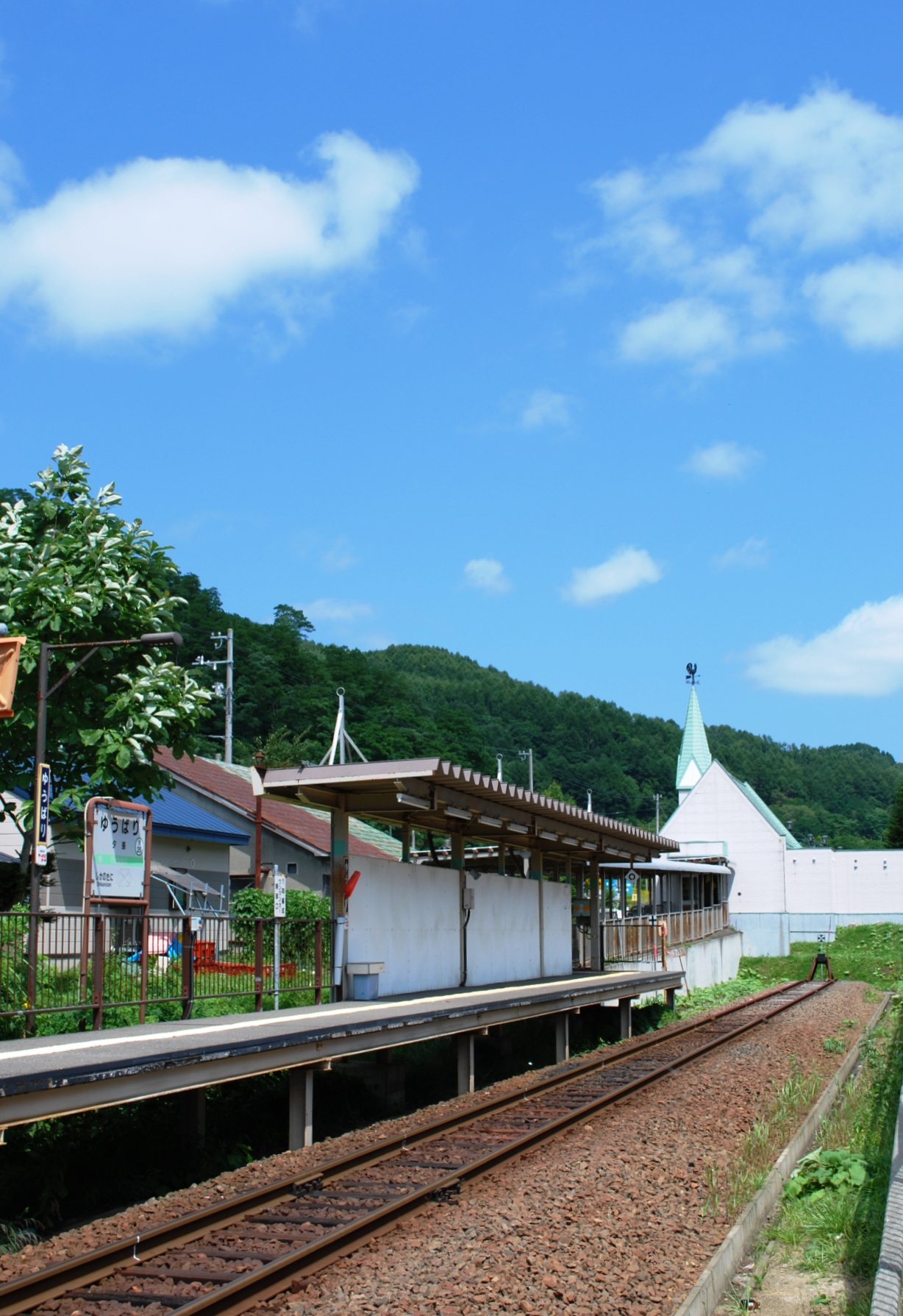
The platform

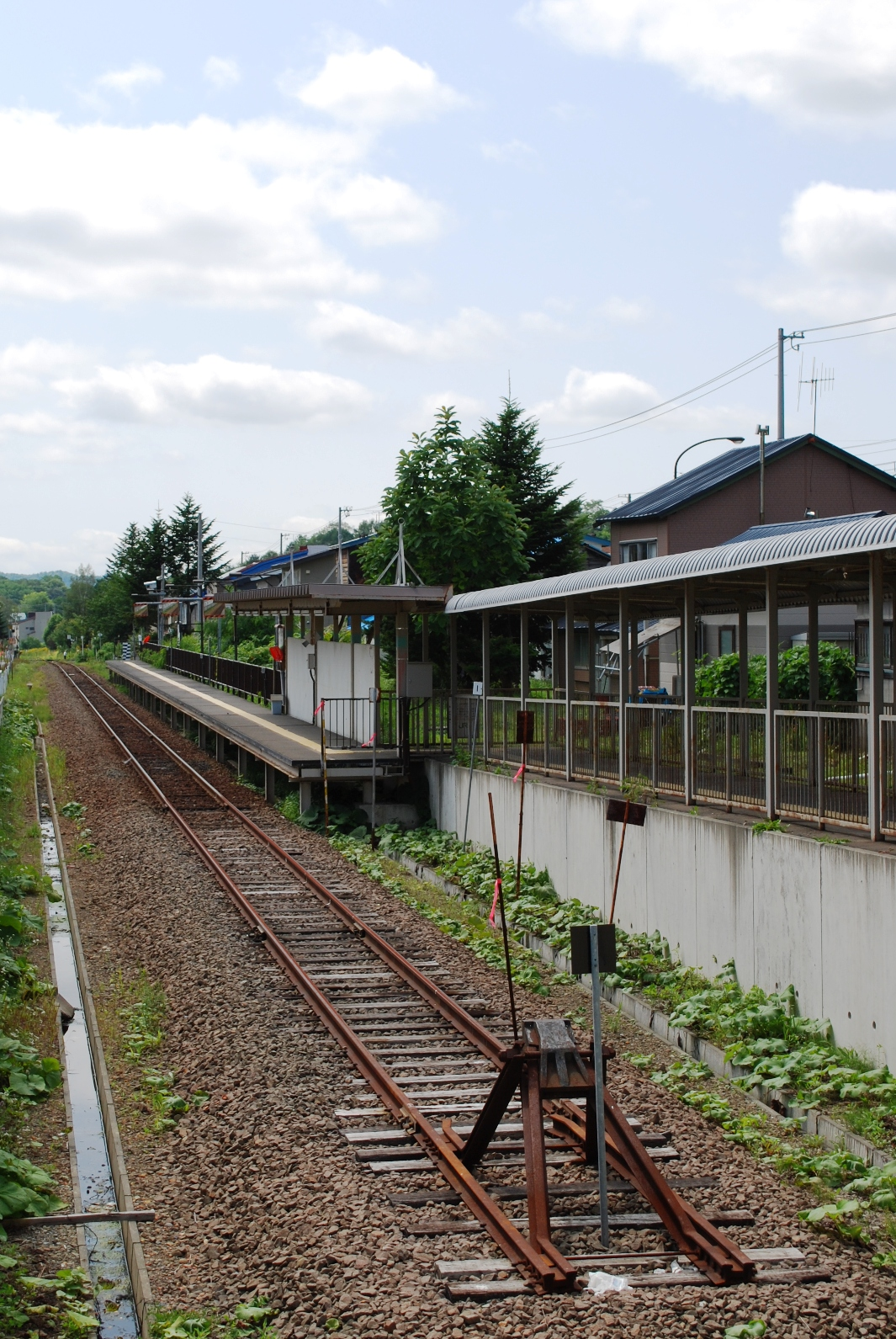
The platform viewed from the buffer stop in August 2008

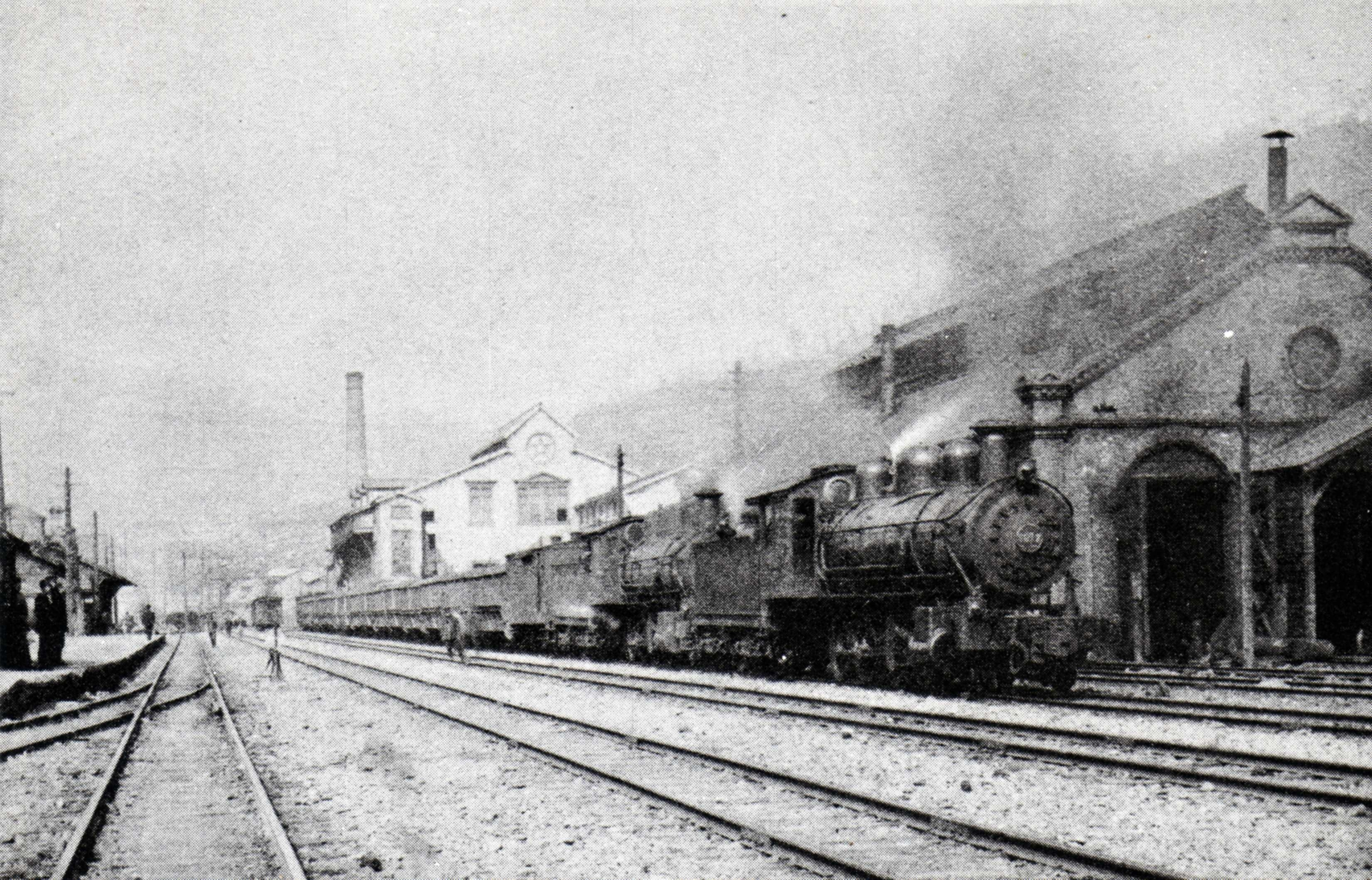
Yūbari Station in 1918

== Adjacent stations ==
| « | Service | » |
Sekishō Line Yūbari Branch
| Shikanotani (Y24) | Local | Terminus |

== Surrounding area ==
- Yūbari City Office
- Yūbari Post office

== See also ==
- List of railway stations in Japan
