= Yūbari Mountains =

Mountain range in the country of Japan

Yubari Mountains
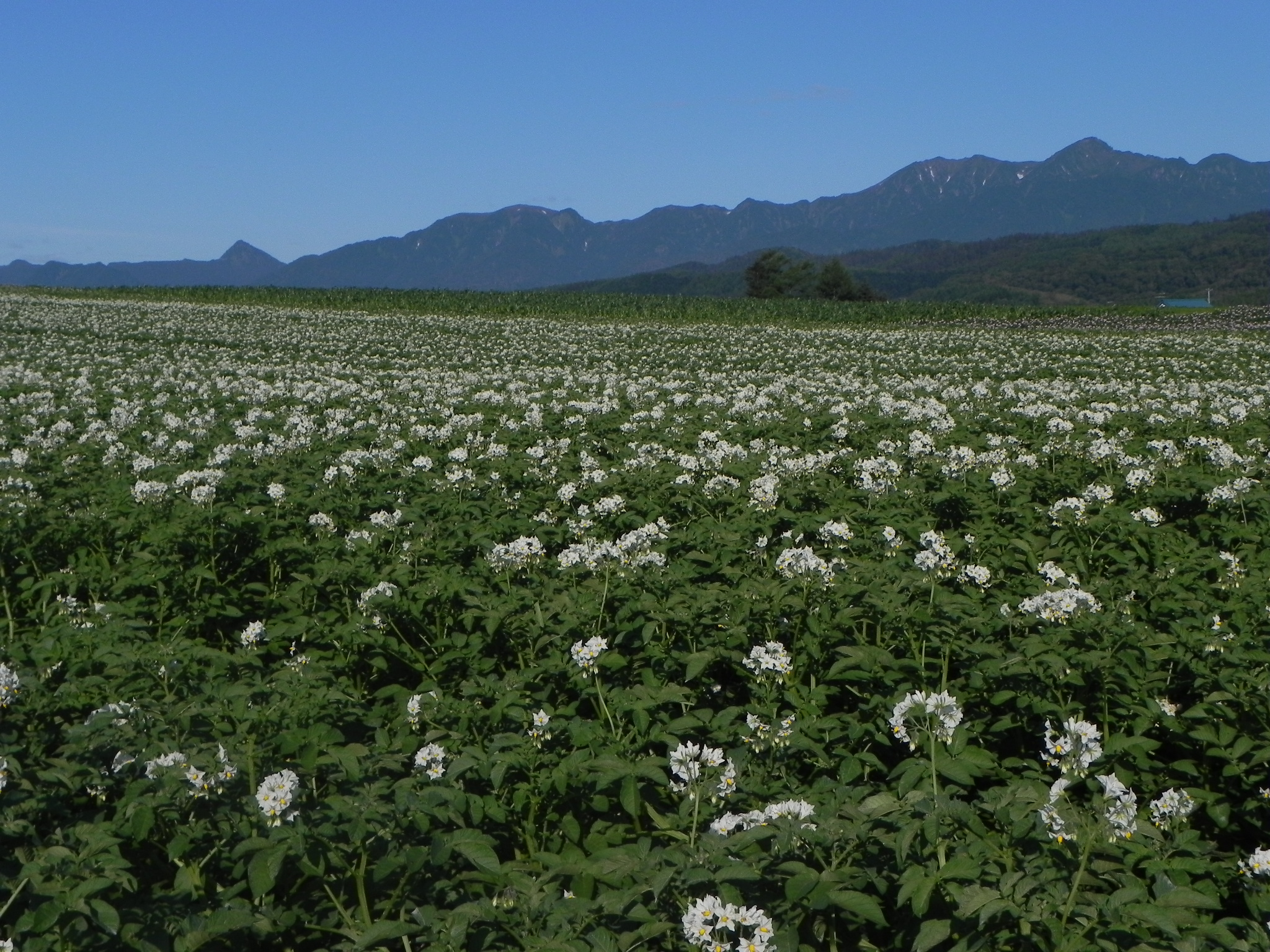
- Yūbari Mountains as seen from the East. Mount Ashibetsu on the Right. Potato fields in the front.

Highest point
- Peak: Mount Ashibetsu
- Coordinates: 43.2358°N 142.2836°E

Naming
- Native name: 夕張山地 (Japanese); Yūbari-sanchi (Japanese)

Geography
- Country: Japan
- State: Hokkaido

Yūbari Mountains (夕張山地, Yūbari-sanchi) is a mountain range of Hokkaido, Japan.

Part of this range is protected by the Furano-Ashibetsu Prefectural Natural Park (富良野芦別道立自然公園).

== Geology ==
The Yūbari Mountains continue the north–south line begun by the Teshio Mountains. The mountains are the result of the collision between the Kurile Island Arc and the Northeastern Japan Arc. Three formations make up the Yūbari mountains:

- Jurassic-Cretaceous formations. This forms the main ridge. It consists of serpentine and rocks of the Sorachi Group. The Sorachi Group consists of chert, greenschist, micrite limestone, and sandstone with felsic tuff.
- Cretaceous forearc sediments. These rocks of the Yezo Supergroup are arranged around the Jurassic-Creaceous formations.
- Paleogene formations. These rocks lie to the west of the Cretaceous sediments. The paleogene formations include seams of coal.

== Peaks ==
- Mount Yūbari
- Mount Ashibetsu
- Mount Furano Nishi
- Mount Torumukeppu
- Mount Hattaomanai
- Mount Kirigishi
- Mount Nireshi
- Mount Hachimori
