= Yūbari, Hokkaido =

City in Hokkaido, Japan

Yūbari 夕張市
- City
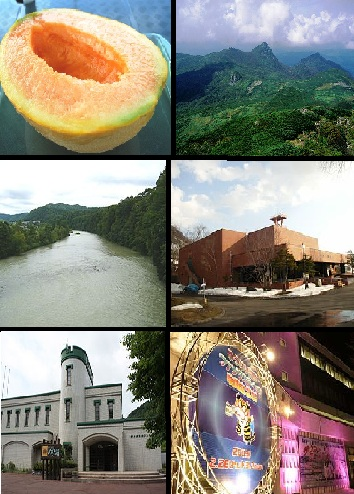
- From top left: Yubari melon, Mount Yubari, Yubari River, Coal Mine Museum in Yubari, Yubari Melon Castle, Yubari Film Festival site

- Flag Seal

- Location of Yūbari in Hokkaido (Sorachi Subprefecture)

- Location in Japan
- Coordinates: 43°3′N 141°58′E
- Country: Japan
- Region: Hokkaido
- Prefecture: Hokkaido (Sorachi Subprefecture)

Government
  - Mayor: Tsukasa Atsuya

Area
  - Total: 763.20 km^{2} (294.67 sq mi)

Population (2026)
  - Total: 5,766
  - Density: 7.555/km^{2} (19.57/sq mi)
- Time zone: UTC+09:00 (JST)
- City hall address: 4-2 Honchō, Yūbari-shi, Hokkaido; 068-0492
- Climate: Dfb
- Website: www.city.yubari.lg.jp
- Symbols
- Flower: Azalea
- Tree: Sakura

Yūbari (夕張市, Yūbari-shi; Japanese pronunciation: [jɨ́ɨ̀.bä̀.ɾʲì, jɨ̀ɨ́.bä́.ɾʲí.ɕì, jɨ́ɨ́.bä́.ɾʲí.ɕì]) is a city located in Sorachi Subprefecture in the prefecture and region of Hokkaido in Japan.

As of 2026, the city has an estimated population of 5,766, with 3,544 households. The total area is 763.20 km^{2} (294.67 sq mi). Hemmed in by mountains, Yūbari stretches for 25 kilometers (16 mi) along a mountain valley.

The city is famous for the Yubari Melon and the Yubari International Fantastic Film Festival, which skipped a show in 2007 due to the city's financial crisis.

== History ==
The city was founded on April 1, 1943, as a coal mining town. When the mines were operating Yūbari had as many as 120,000 people. With the closing of the colliery in the 1980s, an attempt was made to convert the economic base to tourism. Subsidies were obtained from the central government and huge debts incurred for the building of tourist attractions, but few visitors came. In 2007 the city was in the news due to bankruptcy and the refusal of the national government to bail it out. City services had been severely cut and its white elephant amusement park and museums were up for sale. The amusement park has begun to be demolished as of June 2008.

Roughly half of Yūbari's government officials resigned in March 2007 as part of an attempt to streamline the local fiscal situation. The majority of officials stepping down who responded to a survey conducted by Mainichi Shimbun say they "feel no sense of responsibility" for the city's financial problems.

== Geography ==
- Mountain : Mount Yūbari
- River : Yūbari River

=== Climate ===
Climate data for Yūbari (elevation 293 m, 1991–2020 normals, extremes 1976–present)
Month	Jan	Feb	Mar	Apr	May	Jun	Jul	Aug	Sep	Oct	Nov	Dec	Year
Record high °C (°F)	6.6 (43.9)	12.2 (54.0)	15.5 (59.9)	26.2 (79.2)	31.3 (88.3)	31.6 (88.9)	35.0 (95.0)	34.9 (94.8)	31.5 (88.7)	24.7 (76.5)	19.0 (66.2)	12.6 (54.7)	35.0 (95.0)
Mean daily maximum °C (°F)	−2.7 (27.1)	−1.7 (28.9)	2.4 (36.3)	9.9 (49.8)	17.0 (62.6)	20.6 (69.1)	23.7 (74.7)	24.4 (75.9)	20.7 (69.3)	14.1 (57.4)	6.3 (43.3)	−0.6 (30.9)	11.1 (52.0)
Daily mean °C (°F)	−6.6 (20.1)	−6.0 (21.2)	−1.8 (28.8)	4.5 (40.1)	10.9 (51.6)	15.0 (59.0)	18.8 (65.8)	19.6 (67.3)	15.6 (60.1)	8.9 (48.0)	2.1 (35.8)	−4.2 (24.4)	6.4 (43.5)
Mean daily minimum °C (°F)	−11.1 (12.0)	−10.8 (12.6)	−6.4 (20.5)	−0.3 (31.5)	5.5 (41.9)	10.5 (50.9)	15.2 (59.4)	16.0 (60.8)	11.3 (52.3)	4.2 (39.6)	−1.8 (28.8)	−8.1 (17.4)	2.0 (35.6)
Record low °C (°F)	−22.7 (−8.9)	−23.6 (−10.5)	−19.5 (−3.1)	−13.8 (7.2)	−2.8 (27.0)	1.2 (34.2)	5.1 (41.2)	7.1 (44.8)	0.2 (32.4)	−3.8 (25.2)	−13.3 (8.1)	−19.0 (−2.2)	−23.6 (−10.5)
Average precipitation mm (inches)	115.3 (4.54)	82.0 (3.23)	78.5 (3.09)	78.4 (3.09)	107.1 (4.22)	86.4 (3.40)	129.8 (5.11)	185.6 (7.31)	156.0 (6.14)	119.7 (4.71)	129.5 (5.10)	131.5 (5.18)	1,400.1 (55.12)
Average snowfall cm (inches)	225 (89)	172 (68)	132 (52)	34 (13)	0 (0)	0 (0)	0 (0)	0 (0)	0 (0)	3 (1.2)	84 (33)	230 (91)	872 (343)
Average precipitation days (≥ 1.0 mm)	19.0	16.3	14.9	12.5	12.0	10.1	10.8	12.3	12.2	14.5	17.0	20.2	171.5
Mean monthly sunshine hours	94.7	103.7	142.5	160.4	186.1	160.8	132.8	142.0	153.7	134.9	90.9	80.1	1,582.6
Source: Japan Meteorological Agency (1991–2020 normals, extremes 1976–present)

== Demographics ==
As of the 2025 census, the population is 5,610, of which 47.0% are males, and 53.0% are females. Minors make up 6.3% of the population, and seniors make up 55.4%. Foreigners make up 0.4% of the population.

Per Japanese census data, the population has been rapidly declining since 1960.

Historical population

Year	Pop.	±% p.a.
1920	51,064	—
1940	64,998	+1.21%
1950	99,530	+4.35%
1955	107,332	+1.52%
1960	107,972	+0.12%
1965	85,141	−4.64%
1970	69,871	−3.88%
1975	50,131	−6.42%
1980	41,715	−3.61%

Year	Pop.	±% p.a.
1985	31,665	−5.36%
1990	20,969	−7.91%
1995	17,116	−3.98%
2000	14,791	−2.88%
2005	13,001	−2.55%
2010	10,922	−3.42%
2015	8,843	−4.14%
2020	7,334	−3.67%
2025	5,610	−5.22%

Source: Statistics Bureau

== Public sector ==
=== Police ===
- Hokkaido Prefectural Police
  - Kuriyama Police Station (Main station is Kuriyama Town)
    - Yubari Police Building (Former Yubari Police Station)
    - Shimizusawa Police Box, Wakana Police Box
    - Nambu Residential Station, Numanosawa Residential Station, Momijiyama Residential Station

== Education ==
- Yubari City Board Of Education
  - High school
    - Hokkaido Yubari High School
    - Hokkaido Yubari Special High School
  - Junior high school
    - Yubari Junior High School
  - Elementary school
    - Yubari Elementary High School

== Transportation ==
=== Rail ===
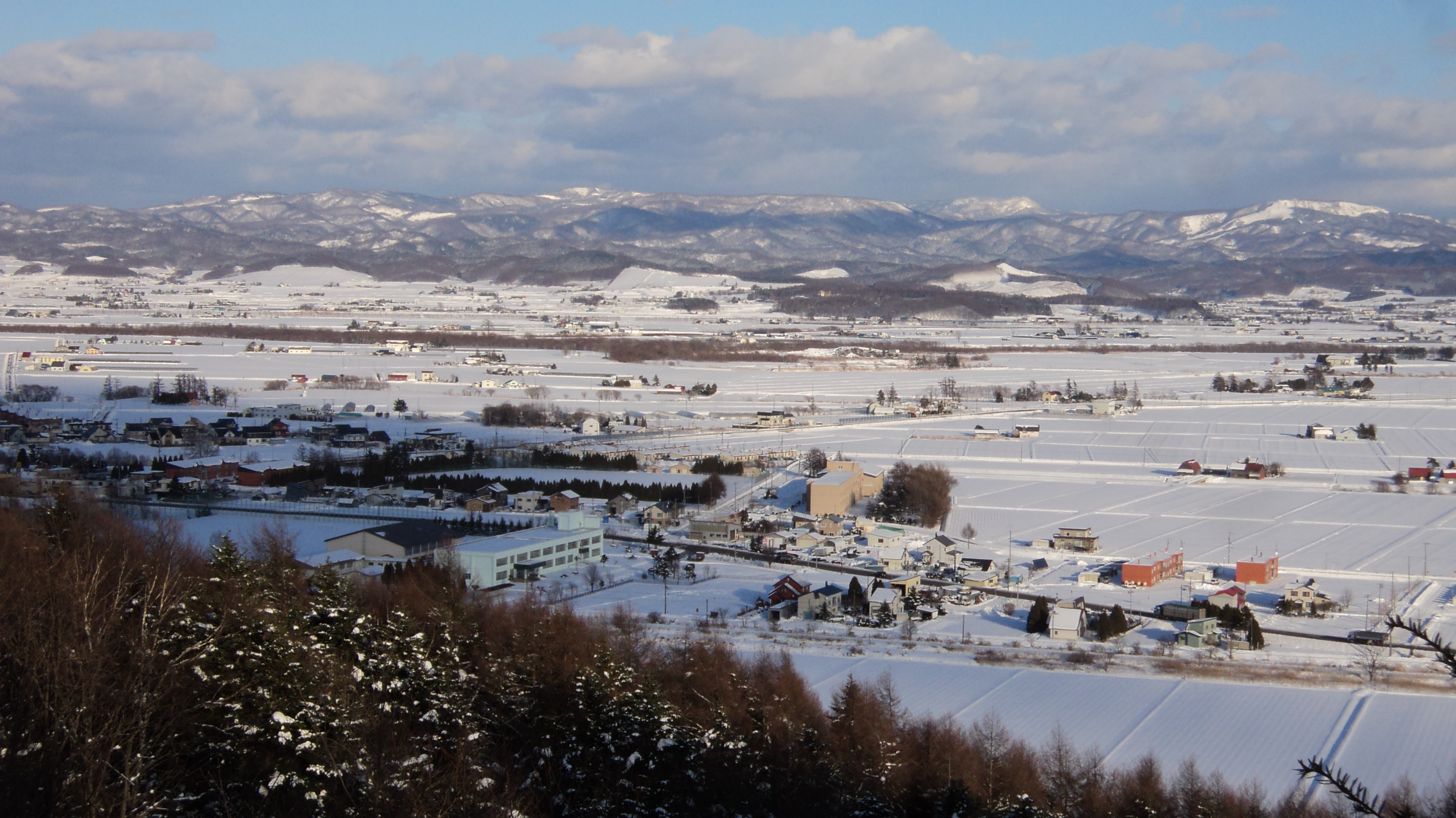
Panorama of Yuni village in Yubari district

The central train station was Yūbari Station on the Yubari branch of the Sekishō Line, formerly operated by JR Hokkaido. However, on March 31, 2019, the Yubari branch line closed after 127 years of operation, requiring passengers from Yubari to take a bus to Shin-Yūbari Station.

- Sekishō Line (Main Line) : Takinoue - Tomisato - Shin-Yūbari - (Kaede Passing Loop)
- Sekishō Line (Yūbari Branch Line - now closed): Shin-Yūbari - Numanosawa - Minami-Shimizusawa - Shimizusawa - Shikanotani - Yūbari

=== Road ===
- Dōtō Expressway : Yūbari IC

=== Bus ===
- Hokkaido Chuo Bus
- Yubari Tetsudo

== Notable people ==
- Mitsuharu Misawa, professional wrestler
- Junko Ohashi, singer

== International relations ==
=== Twin towns – sister cities ===
- Fushun, Liaoning, China (since April 1982)

== See also ==
- Furano-Ashibetsu Prefectural Natural Park
- Ishikari coalfield
- Ōyūbari Dam
