= Kuriyama, Hokkaido =

Kuriyama 栗山町
- Town
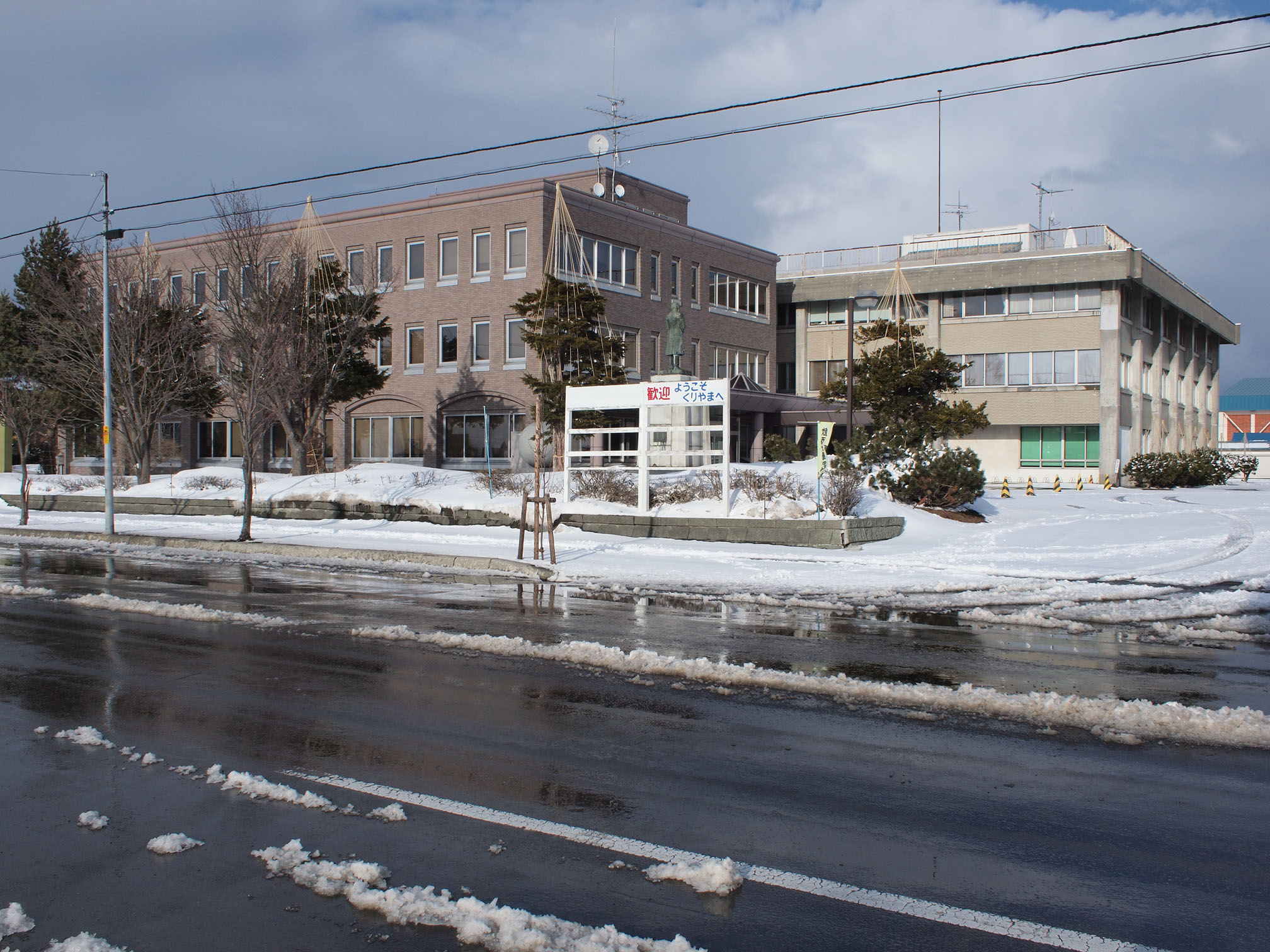
- Kuriyama town hall

- Flag Emblem

- Location of Kuriyama in Sorachi Subprefecture

- Location in Japan
- Coordinates: 43°3′N 141°47′E
- Country: Japan
- Region: Hokkaido
- Prefecture: Sorachi Subprefecture
- District: Yūbari

Area
  - Total: 203.93 km^{2} (78.74 sq mi)

Population (May 31, 2025)
  - Total: 10,571
  - Density: 51.836/km^{2} (134.26/sq mi)
- Time zone: UTC+09:00 (JST)
- Website: www.town.kuriyama.hokkaido.jp

Kuriyama (栗山町, Kuriyama-chō) is a town located in Sorachi Subprefecture, Hokkaido, Japan.

As of May 2025, the town has an estimated population of 10,571, and a density of 51.8 persons per km^{2}. The total area is 203.93 km^{2}.

== Notable people from Kuriyama ==
- Tadashi Watanabe, computer engineer
