= Yūbari River =

River in Hokkaidō, Japan

Yūbari River 夕張川
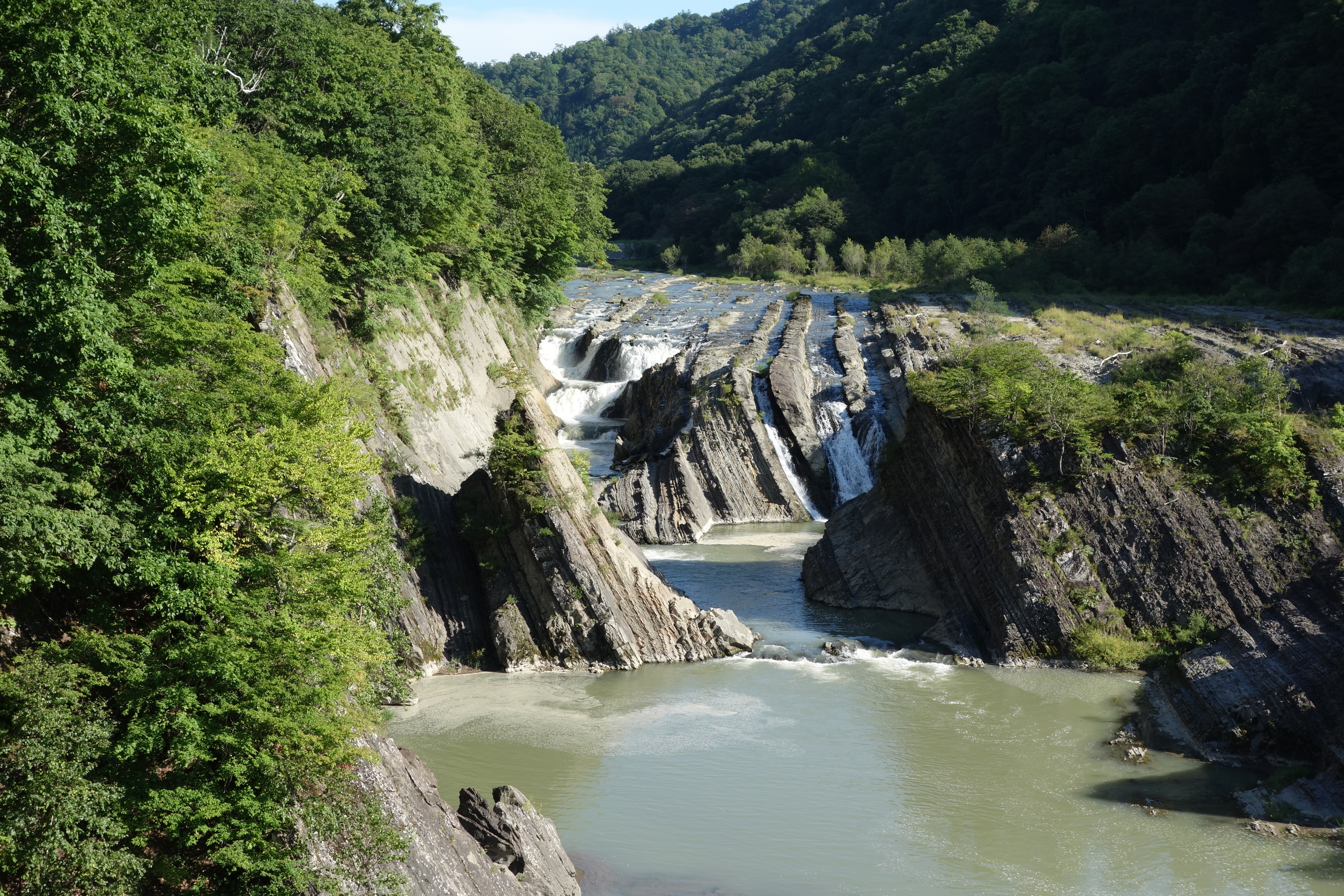
- Chidoriga Falls on the Yūbari River

- Location within Japan
- Native name: Yūbari-gawa (Japanese)

Location
- Country: Japan
- State: Hokkaido

Physical characteristics
- Source: Mount Hachimori
  - location: Yūbari, Hokkaido, Japan
  - coordinates: 43°11′32″N 142°15′26″E
  - elevation: 850 m (2,790 ft)
- Mouth: Ishikari River
  - location: Ebetsu, Hokkaido, Japan
  - coordinates: 43°7′17″N 141°35′11″E
  - elevation: 0 m (0 ft)
- Length: 136 km (85 mi)
- Basin size: 1,417 km^{2} (547 sq mi)

Yūbari River (夕張川, Yūbari-gawa) is a river in Hokkaido, Japan. It flows for 136 km and its drainage basin amounts to 1,417 km^{2}.

It is the namesake of Imperial Japanese Navy cruiser Yūbari.
