= Geography of Hokkaido =

Hokkaidō
Native name: 北海道
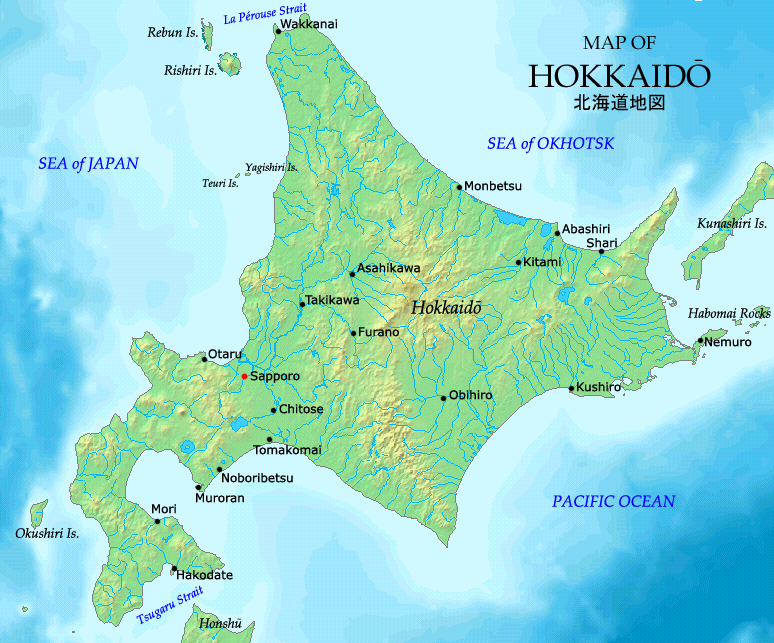
- Interactive map of Hokkaidō

Geography
- Location: East Asia
- Coordinates: 43°N 142°E
- Archipelago: Japanese archipelago
- Area: 77,981.87 km^{2} (30,108.97 sq mi)
- Highest elevation: 2,290 m (7510 ft)
- Highest point: Mount Asahi

Administration
- Japan
- Prefectures: Hokkaidō
- Largest settlement: Sapporo (pop. 1,890,561)

Demographics
- Population: 5,377,435 (September 30, 2016)
- Pop. density: 64.5/km^{2} (167.1/sq mi)
- Ethnic groups: Ainu; Japanese

The island of Hokkaidō is located in the north of Japan, near Russia (Sakhalin Oblast). It has coastlines on the Sea of Japan (to the west of the island), the Sea of Okhotsk (to the north), and the Pacific Ocean (to the east). The center of the island is mountainous, with volcanic plateaux. Hokkaidō has multiple plains such as the Ishikari Plain 3,800 km^{2} (1,500 mi^{2}), Tokachi Plain 3,600 km^{2} (1,400 mi^{2}), the Kushiro Plain 2,510 km^{2} (970 mi^{2}) (the largest wetland in Japan) and Sarobetsu Plain 200 km^{2} (77 mi^{2}). Hokkaidō is 83,423.84 km^{2} (32,210.12 mi^{2}) which makes it the second-largest island of Japan.

The Tsugaru Strait separates Hokkaidō from Honshu (Aomori Prefecture); La Pérouse Strait separates Hokkaidō from the island of Sakhalin in Russia; Nemuro Strait separates Hokkaidō from Kunashir Island in the Russian Kuril Islands.

The governmental jurisdiction of Hokkaidō incorporates several smaller islands, including Rishiri, Okushiri Island, and Rebun. (By Japanese reckoning, Hokkaidō also incorporates several of the Kuril Islands.) Hokkaidō Prefecture is the largest and northernmost Japanese prefecture. The island ranks 21st in the world by area.

== Ecology ==
=== Flora and fauna ===
There are three populations of the Ussuri brown bear found on the island. There are more brown bears in Hokkaidō than anywhere else in Asia besides Russia. The Hokkaidō brown bear is separated into three distinct lineages. There are only eight lineages in the world. Those on Honshu died out long ago.

The native conifer species in northern Hokkaidō is the Sakhalin fir (Abies sachalinensis). The flowering plant Hydrangea hirta is also found on the island.

Notable flora and fauna
| Name | Type | Notes |
|---|---|---|
| Ussuri brown bear | Fauna | One of the largest populations by average size of brown bears (Ursus arctos lasiotus) |
| Steller's sea eagle | Fauna | On average, the heaviest eagle species in the world (Haliaeetus pelagicus) |
| Hokkaido wolf | Fauna | Extinct subspecies of the gray wolf (Canis lupus hattai). |
| Yezo sika deer | Fauna | Large subspecies of the sika deer (Cervus nippon yesoensis) |
| Ezoris | Fauna | Also called the Ezo squirrel (Sciurus vulgaris orientis) |
| Ezo red fox | Fauna | Native to northern Japanese archipelago (Vulpes vulpes schrencki) |
| Ezo tanuki | Fauna | Subspecies of raccoon dog native to Hokkaido (Nyctereutes viverrinus albus) |
| Hokkaido dog | Fauna | A Spitz-type domesticated hunting dog perhaps descend from introduced Akitas |
| Dosanko | Fauna | Also called the "Hokkaido horse" |
| Sable | Fauna | (Martes zibellina) A species of marten which inhabits Hokkaido and Northern Asia. |
| Viviparous lizard | Fauna | (Zootoca vivipara) |
| Ezo salamander | Fauna | (Hynobius retardatus) |
| Dolly Varden trout | Fauna | (Salvelinus malma) |
| Sasakia charonda | Fauna | National butterfly of Japan (ō-murasaki, "great purple") |
| Grey Heron | Fauna | (Ardea cinerea) Long legged wading bird. |
| Chum salmon | Fauna | (white salmon (白鮭 シロサケ) is native to middle and northern Honshu, Hokkaido and the North Pacific. |
| Sockeye salmon | Fauna | (Oncorhynchus nerka, ベニザケ - Benizake) live in Hokkaido and the North Pacific. |
| Ezo spruce | Flora | Picea jezoensis |
| Sakhalin spruce | Flora | Picea glehnii |
| Japanese rose | Flora | Rosa rugosa |

== Geology ==
Like many areas of Japan, Hokkaidō is seismically active. Aside from numerous earthquakes, the following volcanoes are considered still active (at least one eruption since 1850):

- Hokkaido Koma-ga-take
- Mount Usu and Shōwa-shinzan
- Mount Tarumae
- Mount Tokachi
- Mount Meakan

In 1993, an earthquake of magnitude 7.7 generated a tsunami which devastated Okushiri, killing 202 inhabitants. An earthquake of magnitude 8.3 struck near the island on September 26, 2003. On September 6, 2018, an earthquake of magnitude 6.6 struck with its epicenter near the city of Tomakomai, causing a blackout across the whole island.

On May 16, 2021, an earthquake measuring 6.1 on the Richter scale struck off Japan's Hokkaidō prefecture.

== Parks ==
National parks (国立公園)
| Shiretoko National Park* | 知床 |
| Akan Mashu National Park | 阿寒 |
| Kushiro-shitsugen National Park | 釧路湿原 |
| Daisetsuzan National Park | 大雪山 |
| Shikotsu-Tōya National Park | 支笏洞爺 |
| Rishiri-Rebun-Sarobetsu National Park | 利尻礼文サロベツ |

* designated a World Heritage Site by UNESCO on 2005-07-14.

Quasi-national parks (国定公園)
| Abashiri Quasi-National Park | 網走 |
| Hidaka-sanmyaku Erimo Quasi-National Park | 日高山脈襟裳 |
| Niseko-Shakotan-Otaru Kaigan Quasi-National Park | ニセコ積丹小樽海岸 |
| Ōnuma Quasi-National Park | 大沼 |
| Shokanbetsu-Teuri-Yagishiri Quasi-National Park | 暑寒別天売焼尻 |

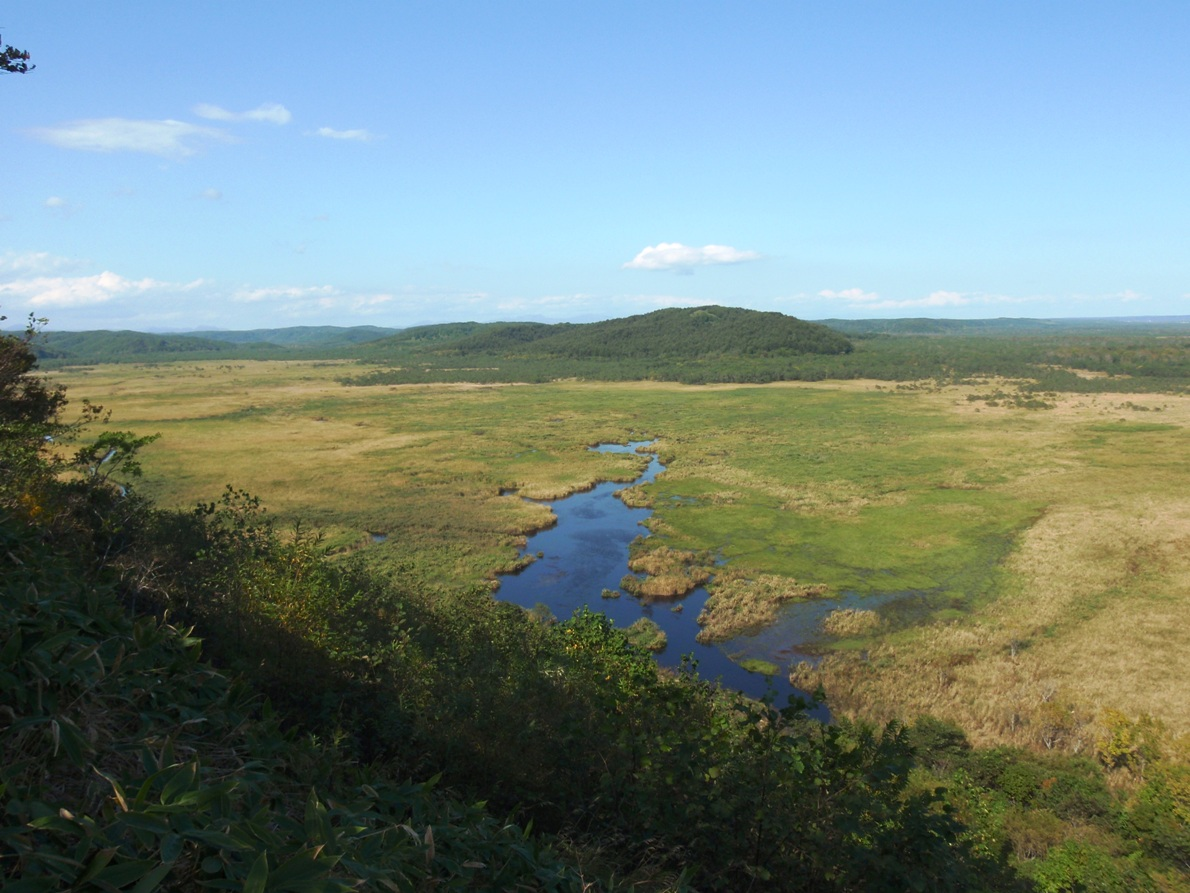
Overview of Kushiro Wetland

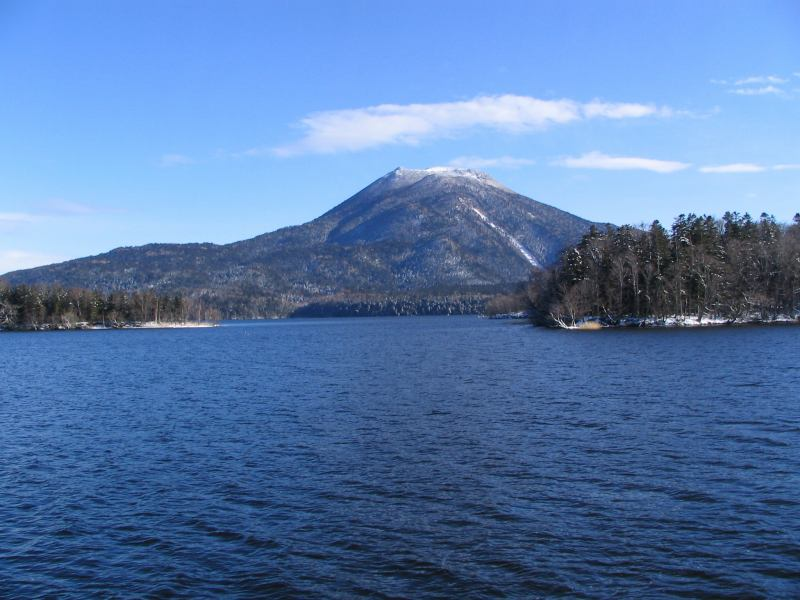
Lake Akan and Mount Meakan

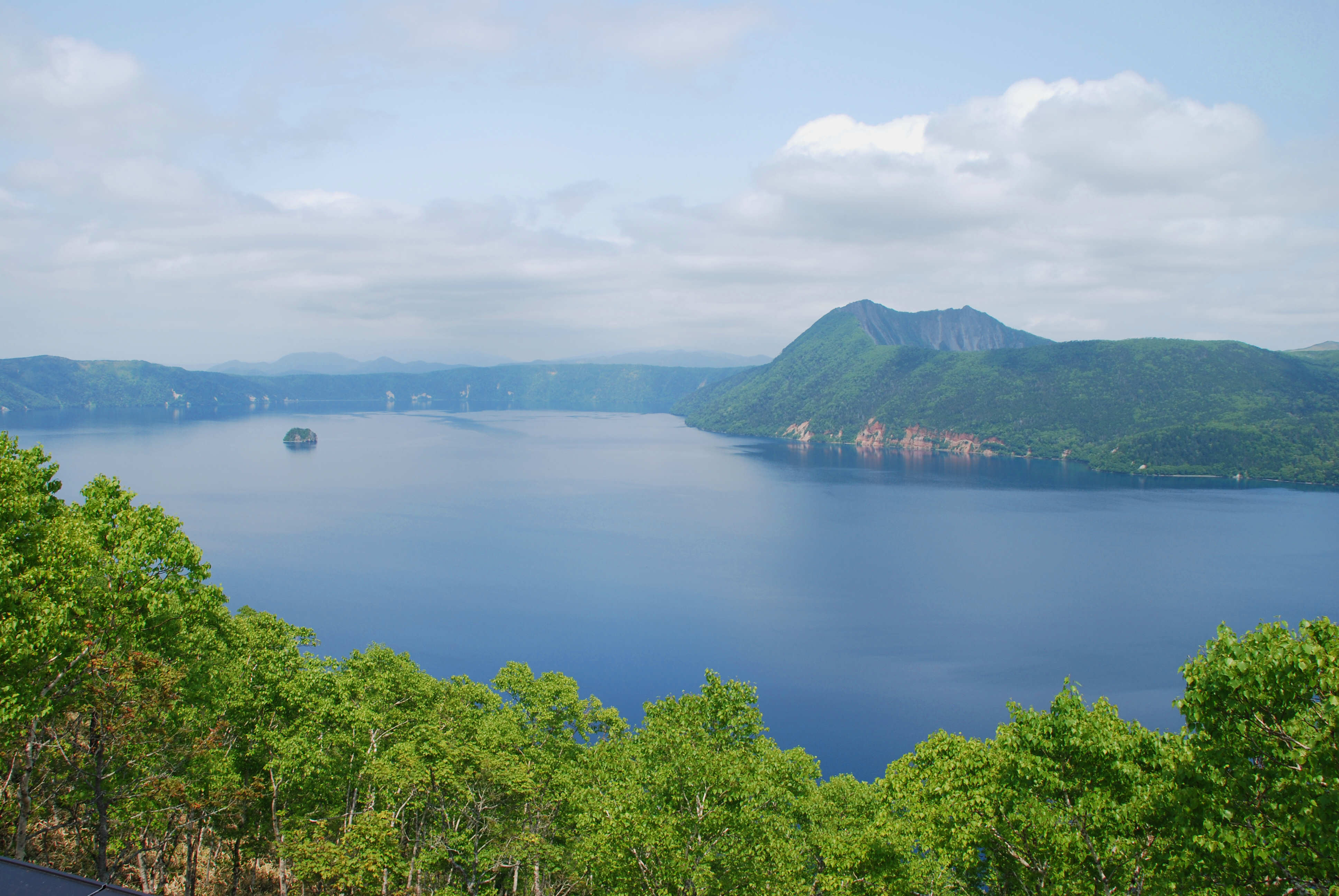
View of Lake Mashū

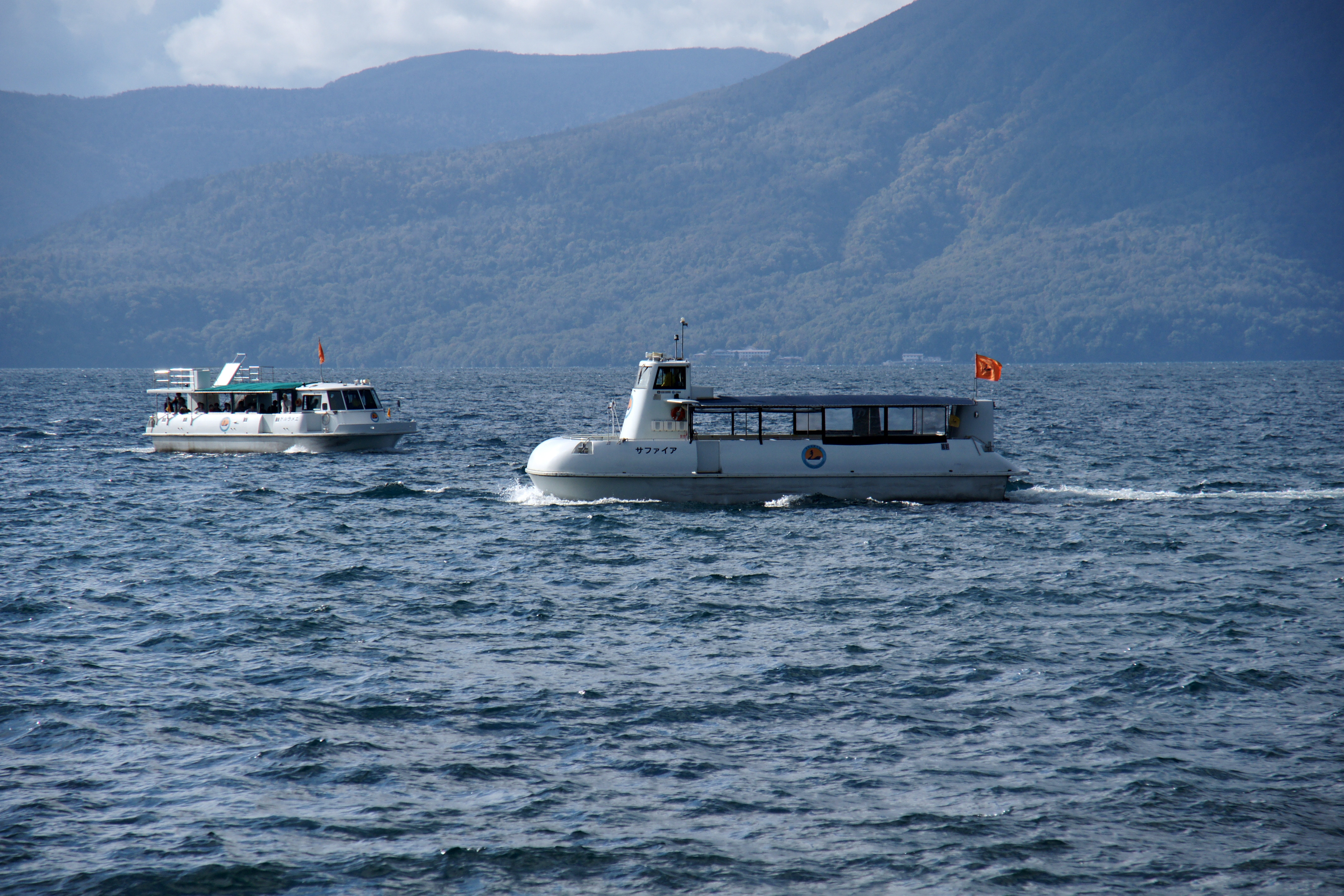
Lake Shikotsu

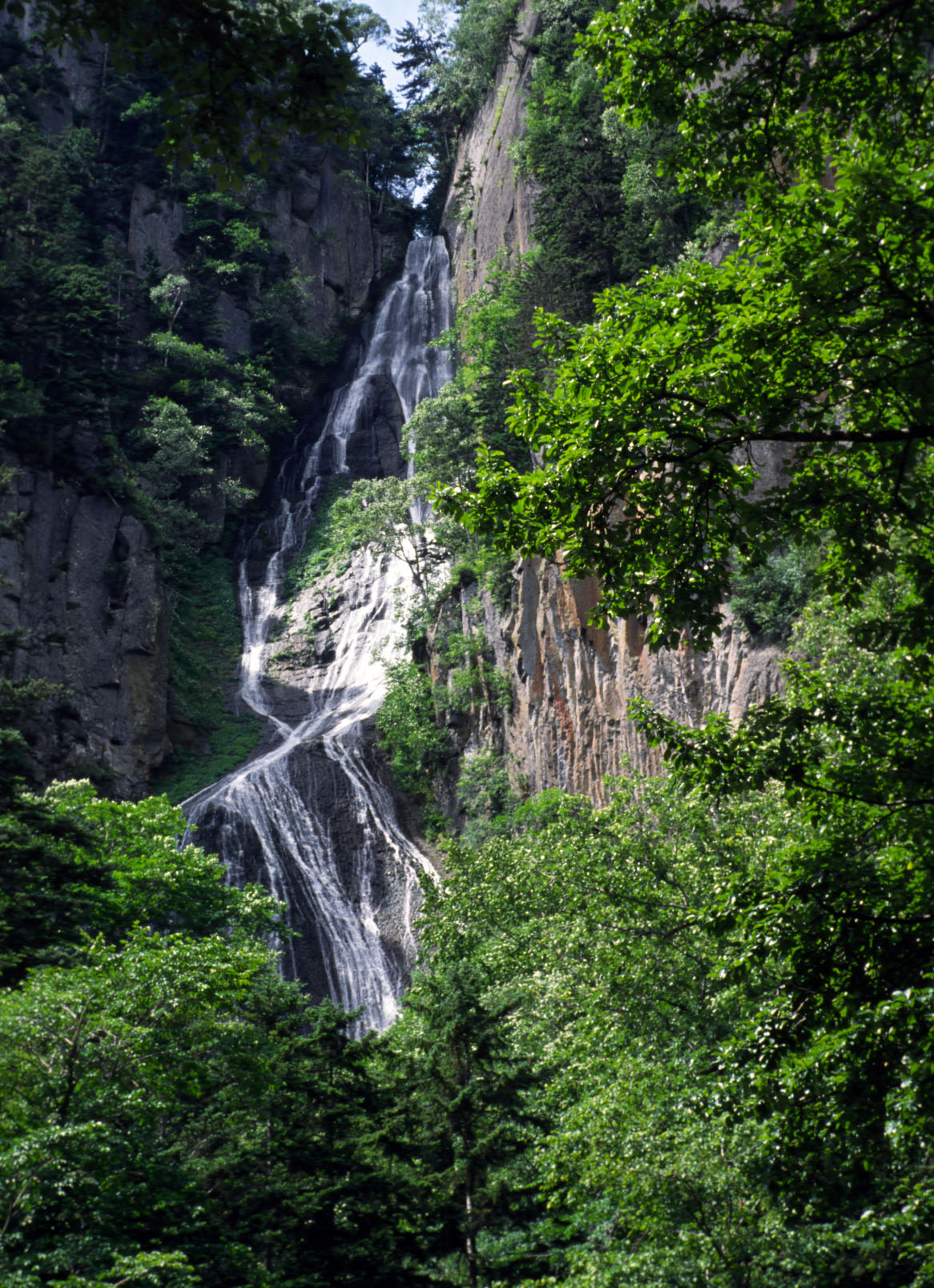
Sōunkyō, a gorge in the Daisetsu-zan Volcanic Area
- Twelve prefectural natural parks (道立自然公園). The prefectural natural parks cover 146,802 ha, the largest area of any prefecture.
  - Akkeshi Prefectural Natural Park
  - Esan Prefectural Natural Park
  - Furano-Ashibetsu Prefectural Natural Park
  - Hiyama Prefectural Natural Park
  - Kariba-Motta Prefectural Natural Park
  - Matsumae-Yagoshi Prefectural Natural Park
  - North Okhotsk Prefectural Natural Park
  - Nopporo Shinrin Kōen Prefectural Natural Park
  - Notsuke-Fūren Prefectural Natural Park
  - Sharidake Prefectural Natural Park
  - Shumarinai Prefectural Natural Park
  - Teshiodake Prefectural Natural Park

Ramsar wetland sites
| | | since |
|---|---|---|
| Kushiro Wetland | 釧路湿原 | 1980-06-17 |
| Lake Kutcharo | クッチャロ湖 | 1989-07-06 |
| Lake Utonai | ウトナイ湖 | 1991-12-12 |
| Kiritappu Wetland | 霧多布湿原 | 1993-06-10 |
| Lake Akkeshi, Bekkanbeushi Wetland | 厚岸湖・別寒辺牛湿原 | 1993-06-10, enlarged 2005-11-08 |
| Miyajima Marsh | 宮島沼 | 2002-11-18 |
| Uryūnuma Wetland | 雨竜沼湿原 | 2005-11-08 |
| Sarobetsu plain | サロベツ原野 | 2005-11-08 |
| Lake Tōfutsu | 濤沸湖 | 2005-11-08 |
| Lake Akan | 阿寒湖 | 2005-11-08 |
| Notsuke Peninsula, Notsuke Bay | 野付半島・野付湾 | 2005-11-08 |
| Lake Fūren, Shunkunitai | 風蓮湖・春国岱 | 2005-11-08 |

== Subprefectures ==
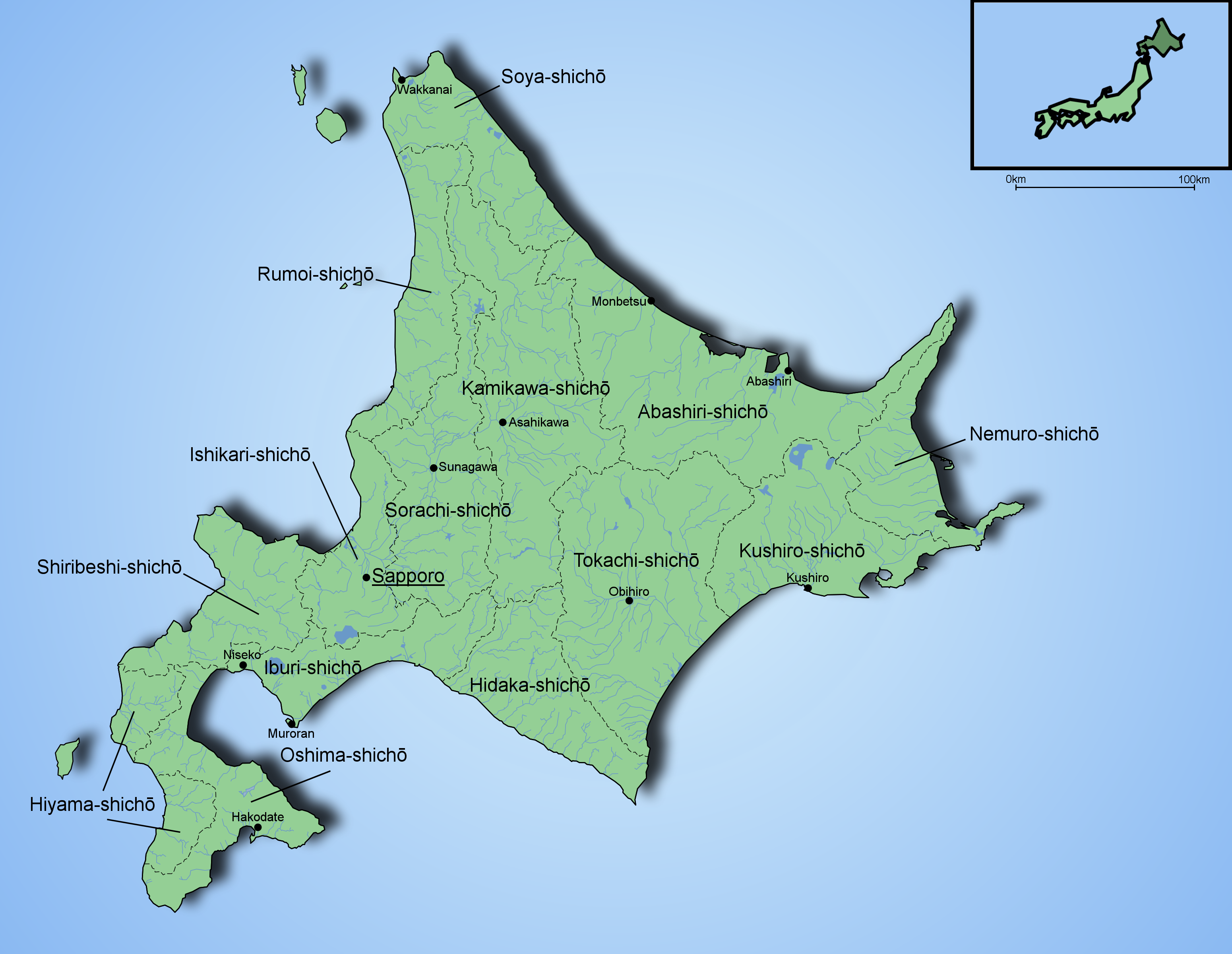
Map of Hokkaido showing the subprefectures and the primary cities

As of April 2010, Hokkaidō has nine General Subprefectural Bureaus (総合振興局) and five Subprefectural Bureaus (振興局). Hokkaidō is one of eight prefectures in Japan that have subprefectures (支庁 shichō). However, it is the only one of the eight to have such offices covering the whole of its territory outside the main cities (rather than having them just for outlying islands or remote areas). This is mostly because of its great size; many parts of the prefecture are simply too far away to be effectively administered by Sapporo. Subprefectural offices in Hokkaidō carry out many of the duties that prefectural offices fulfill elsewhere in Japan.

| Subprefecture | | Japanese | Main city | Largest municipality | Pop. (2009) | Area (km^{2}) | Municipalities | | |
|---|---|---|---|---|---|---|---|---|---|
| 1 | Sorachi | 空知総合振興局 | Iwamizawa | Iwamizawa | 338,485 | 5,791.19 | 10 cities | 14 towns | |
| a | ↳ Ishikari | 石狩振興局 | Sapporo | Sapporo | 2,324,878 | 3,539.86 | 6 cities | 1 town | 1 village |
| 2 | Shiribeshi | 後志総合振興局 | Kutchan | Otaru | 234,984 | 4,305.83 | 1 city | 13 towns | 6 villages |
| 3 | Iburi | 胆振総合振興局 | Muroran | Tomakomai | 419,115 | 3,698.00 | 4 cities | 7 towns | |
| b | ↳ Hidaka | 日高振興局 | Urakawa | Shinhidaka | 76,084 | 4,811.97 | | 7 towns | |
| 4 | Oshima | 渡島総合振興局 | Hakodate | Hakodate | 433,475 | 3,936.46 | 2 cities | 9 towns | |
| c | ↳ Hiyama | 檜山振興局 | Esashi | Setana | 43,210 | 2,629.94 | | 7 towns | |
| 5 | Kamikawa | 上川総合振興局 | Asahikawa | Asahikawa | 527,575 | 10,619.20 | 4 cities | 17 towns | 2 villages |
| d | ↳ Rumoi | 留萌振興局 | Rumoi | Rumoi | 53,916 | 3,445.75 | 1 city | 6 towns | 1 village |
| 6 | Sōya | 宗谷総合振興局 | Wakkanai | Wakkanai | 71,423 | 4,625.09 | 1 city | 8 towns | 1 village |
| 7 | Okhotsk | オホーツク総合振興局 | Abashiri | Kitami | 309,487 | 10,690.62 | 3 cities | 14 towns | 1 village |
| 8 | Tokachi | 十勝総合振興局 | Obihiro | Obihiro | 353,291 | 10,831.24 | 1 city | 16 towns | 2 villages |
| 9 | Kushiro | 釧路総合振興局 | Kushiro | Kushiro | 252,571 | 5,997.38 | 1 city | 6 towns | 1 village |
| e | ↳ Nemuro | 根室振興局 | Nemuro | Nemuro | 84,035 | 3,406.23 | 1 city | 4 towns | * |
* Japan claims the southern part of Kuril Islands (Northern Territories), currently administered by Russia, belong to Nemuro Subprefecture divided into six villages. However, the table above excludes these islands' data.

== Climate ==
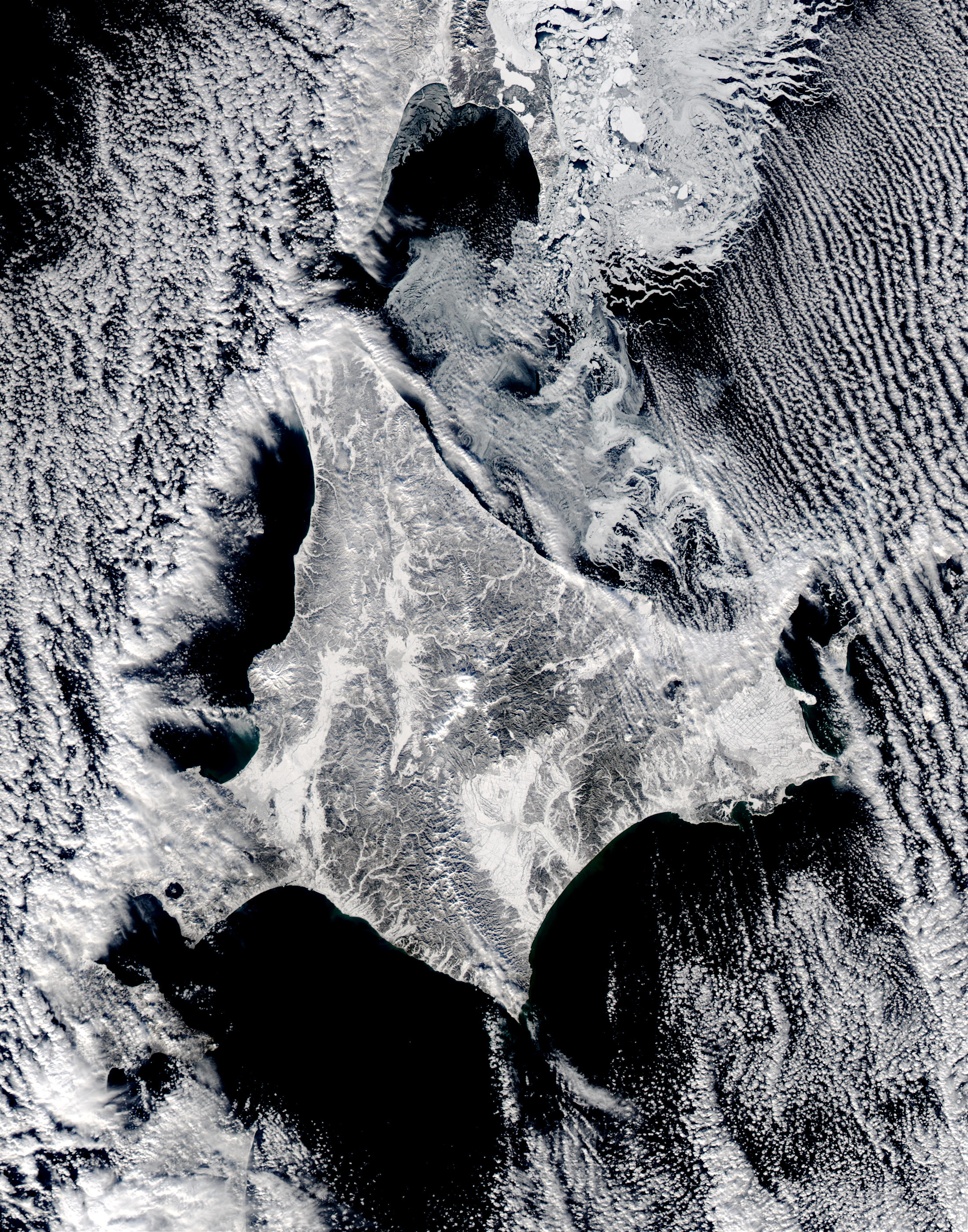
Satellite image of Hokkaidō in winter

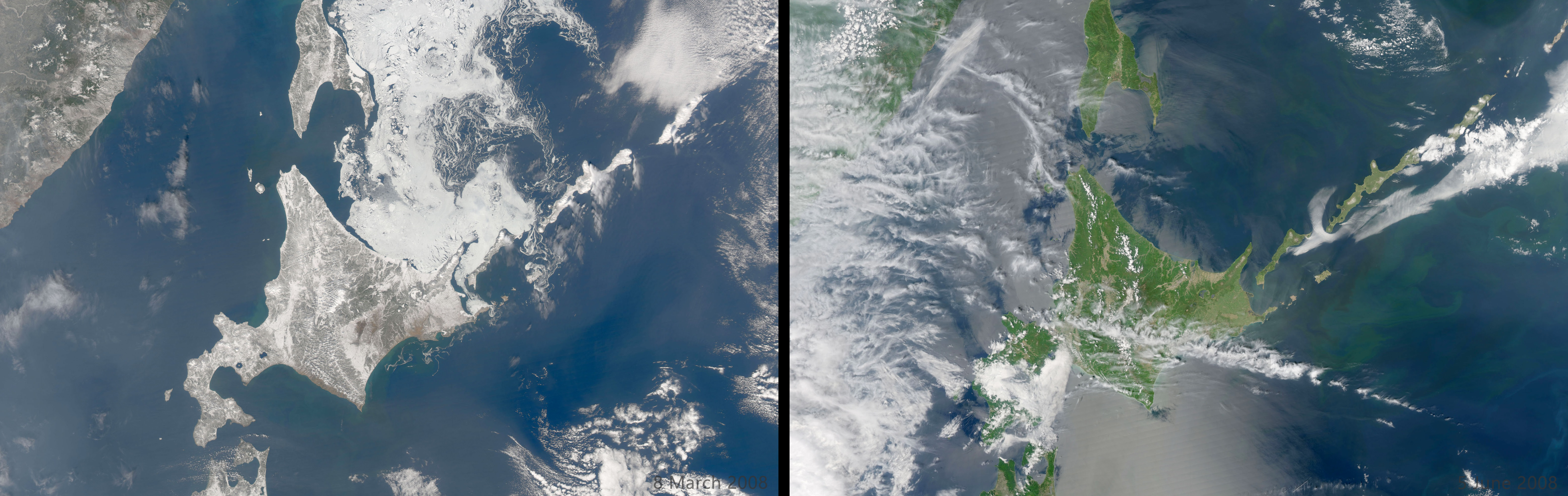
Hokkaido in winter and summer

As Japan's coldest region, Hokkaidō has relatively cool summers and icy/snowy winters. Most of the island falls in the humid continental climate zone with Köppen climate classification Dfb (hemiboreal) in most areas but Dfa (hot summer humid continental) in some inland lowlands. The average August temperature ranges from 17 to 22 °C (62.6 to 71.6 °F), while the average January temperature ranges from −12 to −4 °C (10.4 to 24.8 °F), in both cases depending on elevation and distance from the ocean, though temperatures on the western side of the island tend to be a little warmer than on the eastern. The highest temperature ever recorded is 39.5 °C (103.1 °F) on 26 May 2019.

The northern portion of Hokkaidō falls into the taiga biome with significant snowfall. Snowfall varies widely from as much as 11 metres (400 in) on the mountains adjacent to the Sea of Japan down to around 1.8 metres (71 in) on the Pacific coast. The island tends to have isolated snowstorms that develop long-lasting snowbanks. Total precipitation varies from 1,600 millimetres (63 in) on the mountains of the Sea of Japan coast to around 800 millimetres (31 in) (the lowest in Japan) on the Sea of Okhotsk coast and interior lowlands and up to around 1,100 millimetres (43 in) on the Pacific side. The generally high quality of powder snow and numerous mountains in Hokkaidō make it a popular region for snow sports. The snowfall usually commences in earnest in November and ski resorts (such as those at Niseko, Furano, Teine and Rusutsu) usually operate between December and April. Hokkaidō celebrates its winter weather at the Sapporo Snow Festival.

During the winter, passage through the Sea of Okhotsk is often complicated by large floes of drift ice. Combined with high winds that occur during winter, this frequently brings air travel and maritime activity to a halt beyond the northern coast of Hokkaidō. Ports on the open Pacific Ocean and Sea of Japan are generally ice-free year round, though most rivers freeze during the winter.

Unlike the other major islands of Japan, Hokkaidō is normally not affected by the May–June monsoon season and the lack of relative humidity and typically warm, rather than hot, summer weather makes its climate an attraction for tourists from other parts of Japan.

=== Climate data ===
Monthly average highs and lows for various cities and towns in Hokkaido in Celsius and Fahrenheit
| City | Jan | Feb | Mar | Apr | May | Jun | Jul | Aug | Sep | Oct | Nov | Dec |
|---|---|---|---|---|---|---|---|---|---|---|---|---|
| Sapporo | −0.4 / −6.4 (31.3 / 20.5) | 0.4 / −6.2 (32.7 / 20.8) | 4.5 / −2.4 (40.1 / 27.7) | 11.7 / 3.4 (53.1 / 38.1) | 17.9 / 9.0 (64.2 / 48.2) | 21.8 / 13.4 (71.2 / 56.1) | 25.4 / 17.9 (77.7 / 64.2) | 26.4 / 19.1 (79.5 / 66.4) | 22.8 / 14.8 (73.0 / 58.6) | 16.4 / 8.0 (61.5 / 46.4) | 8.7 / 1.6 (47.7 / 34.9) | 2.0 / −4.0 (35.6 / 24.8) |
| Hakodate | 0.9 / −6.0 (33.6 / 21.2) | 1.8 / −5.7 (35.2 / 21.7) | 5.8 / −2.2 (42.4 / 28.0) | 12.0 / 2.8 (53.6 / 37.0) | 17.0 / 8.0 (62.6 / 46.4) | 20.4 / 12.6 (68.7 / 54.7) | 24.1 / 17.3 (75.4 / 63.1) | 25.9 / 18.9 (78.6 / 66.0) | 23.2 / 14.6 (73.8 / 58.3) | 17.1 / 7.8 (62.8 / 46.0) | 10.0 / 1.8 (50.0 / 35.2) | 3.2 / −3.6 (37.8 / 25.5) |
| Asahikawa | −3.3 / −11.7 (26.1 / 10.9) | −1.7 / −11.8 (28.9 / 10.8) | 3.0 / −6.1 (37.4 / 21.0) | 11.2 / 0.2 (52.2 / 32.4) | 18.8 / 6.1 (65.8 / 43.0) | 22.8 / 12.0 (73.0 / 53.6) | 26.2 / 16.4 (79.2 / 61.5) | 26.6 / 16.9 (79.9 / 62.4) | 21.9 / 11.7 (71.4 / 53.1) | 14.9 / 4.4 (58.8 / 39.9) | 6.2 / −1.5 (43.2 / 29.3) | −0.8 / −8.0 (30.6 / 17.6) |
| Kushiro | −0.2 / −9.8 (31.6 / 14.4) | −0.1 / −9.4 (31.8 / 15.1) | 3.3 / −4.2 (37.9 / 24.4) | 8.0 / 0.7 (46.4 / 33.3) | 12.6 / 5.4 (54.7 / 41.7) | 15.8 / 9.5 (60.4 / 49.1) | 19.6 / 13.6 (67.3 / 56.5) | 21.5 / 15.7 (70.7 / 60.3) | 20.1 / 12.9 (68.2 / 55.2) | 15.1 / 6.1 (59.2 / 43.0) | 8.9 / −0.3 (48.0 / 31.5) | 2.5 / −7.0 (36.5 / 19.4) |
| Wakkanai | −2.4 / −6.4 (27.7 / 20.5) | −2.0 / −6.7 (28.4 / 19.9) | 1.6 / −3.1 (34.9 / 26.4) | 7.4 / 1.8 (45.3 / 35.2) | 12.4 / 6.3 (54.3 / 43.3) | 16.1 / 10.4 (61.0 / 50.7) | 20.1 / 14.9 (68.2 / 58.8) | 22.3 / 17.2 (72.1 / 63.0) | 20.1 / 14.4 (68.2 / 57.9) | 14.1 / 8.4 (57.4 / 47.1) | 6.3 / 1.3 (43.3 / 34.3) | 0.0 / −4.2 (32.0 / 24.4) |
| Rikubetsu | −2.5 / −19.6 (27.5 / −3.3) | −1.4 / −18.8 (29.5 / −1.8) | 3.2 / −10.6 (37.8 / 12.9) | 10.5 / −2.5 (50.9 / 27.5) | 17.1 / 3.4 (62.8 / 38.1) | 20.6 / 9.1 (69.1 / 48.4) | 23.7 / 14.0 (74.7 / 57.2) | 24.4 / 15.0 (75.9 / 59.0) | 20.8 / 9.8 (69.4 / 49.6) | 14.7 / 1.8 (58.5 / 35.2) | 7.1 / −5.3 (44.8 / 22.5) | −0.2 / −14.9 (31.6 / 5.2) |
| Saroma | −2.6 / −15.6 (27.3 / 3.9) | −2.2 / −16.3 (28.0 / 2.7) | 2.5 / −9.5 (36.5 / 14.9) | 10.2 / −1.8 (50.4 / 28.8) | 16.9 / 3.8 (62.4 / 38.8) | 20.2 / 8.9 (68.4 / 48.0) | 23.9 / 13.6 (75.0 / 56.5) | 24.9 / 14.8 (76.8 / 58.6) | 21.6 / 10.1 (70.9 / 50.2) | 15.3 / 2.9 (59.5 / 37.2) | 7.5 / −3.2 (45.5 / 26.2) | 0.1 / −11.7 (32.2 / 10.9) |
| Okushiri | 1.6 / −2.4 (34.9 / 27.7) | 1.9 / −2.2 (35.4 / 28.0) | 5.3 / 0.7 (41.5 / 33.3) | 10.0 / 5.0 (50.0 / 41.0) | 14.6 / 9.3 (58.3 / 48.7) | 19.0 / 13.6 (66.2 / 56.5) | 22.9 / 17.9 (73.2 / 64.2) | 25.4 / 20.1 (77.7 / 68.2) | 22.6 / 17.5 (72.7 / 63.5) | 16.6 / 11.8 (61.9 / 53.2) | 10.0 / 5.1 (50.0 / 41.2) | 3.9 / −0.5 (39.0 / 31.1) |
| Erimo | 0.2 / −4.0 (32.4 / 24.8) | −0.2 / −4.3 (31.6 / 24.3) | 2.2 / −1.9 (36.0 / 28.6) | 6.1 / 1.3 (43.0 / 34.3) | 10.1 / 5.0 (50.2 / 41.0) | 13.6 / 9.0 (56.5 / 48.2) | 17.5 / 13.4 (63.5 / 56.1) | 19.9 / 15.8 (67.8 / 60.4) | 19.0 / 14.9 (66.2 / 58.8) | 14.7 / 10.2 (58.5 / 50.4) | 9.3 / 4.2 (48.7 / 39.6) | 3.3 / −1.3 (37.9 / 29.7) |

Climate data for Sapporo (1991−2020 normals, extremes 1877−present) (Köppen Dfa)
| Month | Jan | Feb | Mar | Apr | May | Jun | Jul | Aug | Sep | Oct | Nov | Dec | Year |
|---|---|---|---|---|---|---|---|---|---|---|---|---|---|
| Record high °C (°F) | 11.2 (52.2) | 10.8 (51.4) | 18.3 (64.9) | 28.0 (82.4) | 34.2 (93.6) | 33.7 (92.7) | 36.0 (96.8) | 36.2 (97.2) | 32.7 (90.9) | 27.3 (81.1) | 22.4 (72.3) | 14.8 (58.6) | 36.2 (97.2) |
| Mean maximum °C (°F) | 5.1 (41.2) | 7.0 (44.6) | 12.3 (54.1) | 21.3 (70.3) | 27.4 (81.3) | 29.0 (84.2) | 31.4 (88.5) | 32.0 (89.6) | 28.8 (83.8) | 22.7 (72.9) | 17.2 (63.0) | 9.4 (48.9) | 32.7 (90.9) |
| Mean daily maximum °C (°F) | −0.4 (31.3) | 0.4 (32.7) | 4.5 (40.1) | 11.7 (53.1) | 17.9 (64.2) | 21.8 (71.2) | 25.4 (77.7) | 26.4 (79.5) | 22.8 (73.0) | 16.4 (61.5) | 8.7 (47.7) | 2.0 (35.6) | 13.1 (55.6) |
| Daily mean °C (°F) | −3.2 (26.2) | −2.7 (27.1) | 1.1 (34.0) | 7.3 (45.1) | 13.0 (55.4) | 17.0 (62.6) | 21.1 (70.0) | 22.3 (72.1) | 18.6 (65.5) | 12.1 (53.8) | 5.2 (41.4) | −0.9 (30.4) | 9.2 (48.6) |
| Mean daily minimum °C (°F) | −6.4 (20.5) | −6.2 (20.8) | −2.4 (27.7) | 3.4 (38.1) | 9.0 (48.2) | 13.4 (56.1) | 17.9 (64.2) | 19.1 (66.4) | 14.8 (58.6) | 8.0 (46.4) | 1.6 (34.9) | −4.0 (24.8) | 5.7 (42.3) |
| Mean minimum °C (°F) | −11.8 (10.8) | −11.7 (10.9) | −7.9 (17.8) | −1.4 (29.5) | 3.9 (39.0) | 9.0 (48.2) | 13.7 (56.7) | 14.7 (58.5) | 8.7 (47.7) | 2.1 (35.8) | −4.6 (23.7) | −9.0 (15.8) | −12.8 (9.0) |
| Record low °C (°F) | −27.0 (−16.6) | −28.5 (−19.3) | −22.6 (−8.7) | −14.6 (5.7) | −4.2 (24.4) | 0.0 (32.0) | 5.2 (41.4) | 5.3 (41.5) | −0.9 (30.4) | −4.4 (24.1) | −15.5 (4.1) | −24.7 (−12.5) | −28.5 (−19.3) |
| Average precipitation mm (inches) | 108.4 (4.27) | 91.9 (3.62) | 77.6 (3.06) | 54.6 (2.15) | 55.5 (2.19) | 60.4 (2.38) | 90.7 (3.57) | 126.8 (4.99) | 142.2 (5.60) | 109.9 (4.33) | 113.8 (4.48) | 114.5 (4.51) | 1,146.1 (45.12) |
| Average snowfall cm (inches) | 137 (54) | 116 (46) | 74 (29) | 6 (2.4) | 0 (0) | 0 (0) | 0 (0) | 0 (0) | 0 (0) | 1 (0.4) | 30 (12) | 113 (44) | 479 (189) |
| Average precipitation days (≥ 0.5 mm) | 22.1 | 19.2 | 18.3 | 12.3 | 10.2 | 9.3 | 9.4 | 10.5 | 11.7 | 14.0 | 18.3 | 19.9 | 175.1 |
| Average relative humidity (%) | 69 | 68 | 65 | 61 | 65 | 72 | 75 | 75 | 71 | 67 | 67 | 68 | 69 |
| Average dew point °C (°F) | −8 (18) | −8 (18) | −5 (23) | −1 (30) | 6 (43) | 12 (54) | 16 (61) | 18 (64) | 13 (55) | 6 (43) | 0 (32) | −6 (21) | 4 (39) |
| Mean monthly sunshine hours | 90.4 | 103.5 | 144.7 | 175.8 | 200.4 | 180.0 | 168.0 | 168.1 | 159.3 | 145.9 | 99.1 | 82.7 | 1,718 |
| Average ultraviolet index | 1 | 1 | 1 | 3 | 4 | 5 | 5 | 5 | 4 | 2 | 1 | 1 | 3 |
Source 1: Japan Meteorological Agency
Source 2: Weather Atlas (UV), Time and Date (dewpoints, 2005-2015), Météo Climat

== Gallery ==
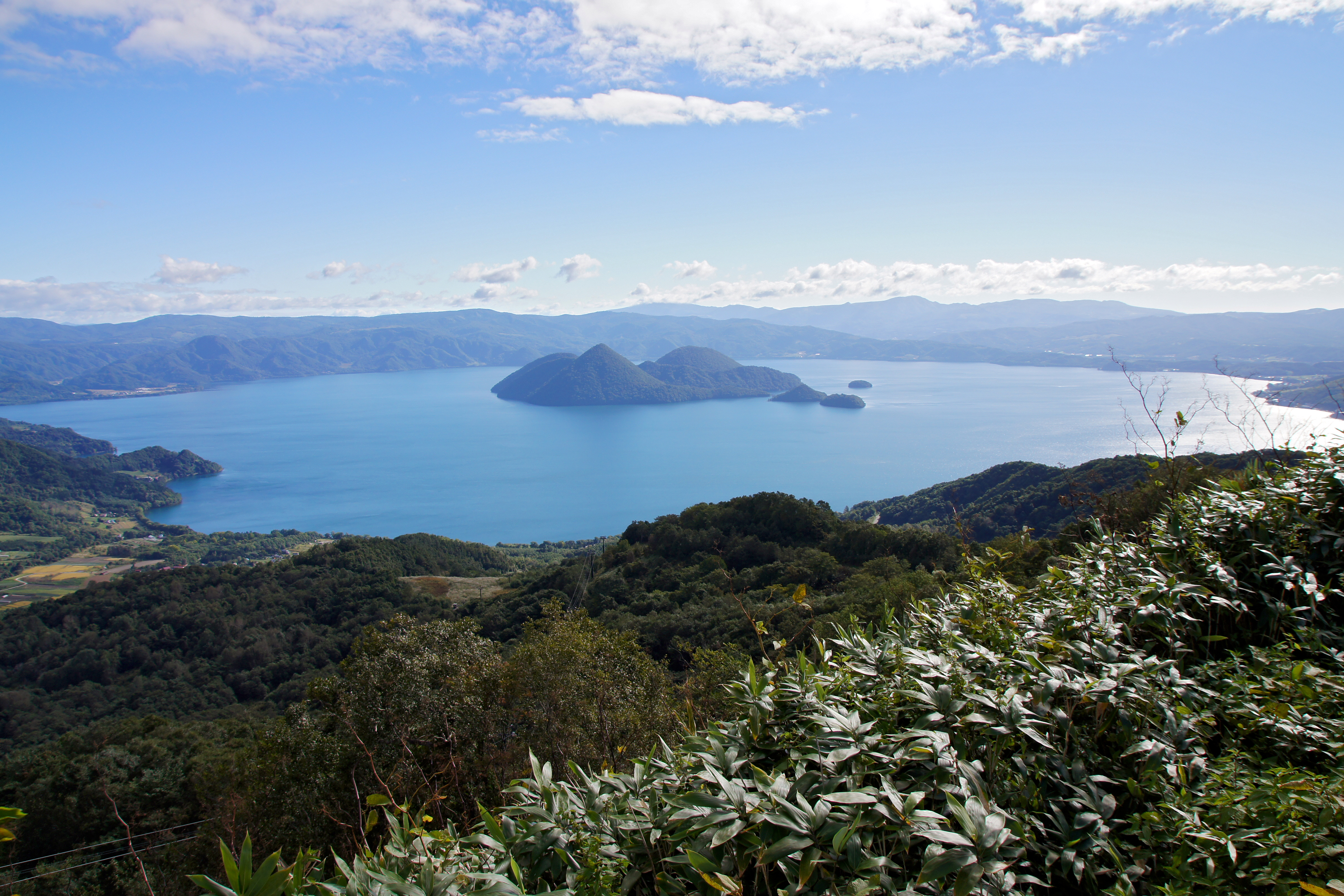
Lake Tōya, a volcanic caldera lake

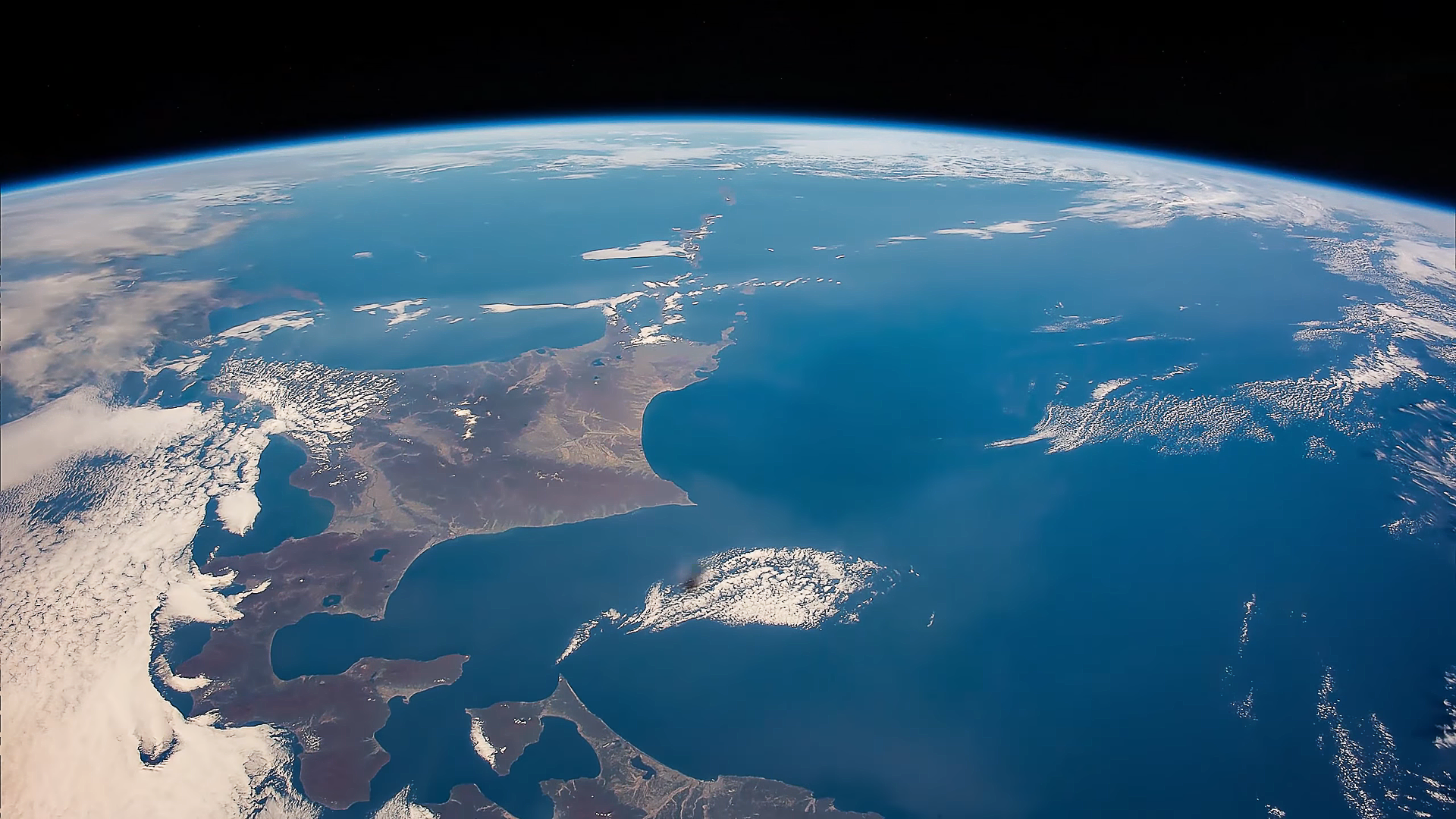
Hokkaido seen from the International Space Station

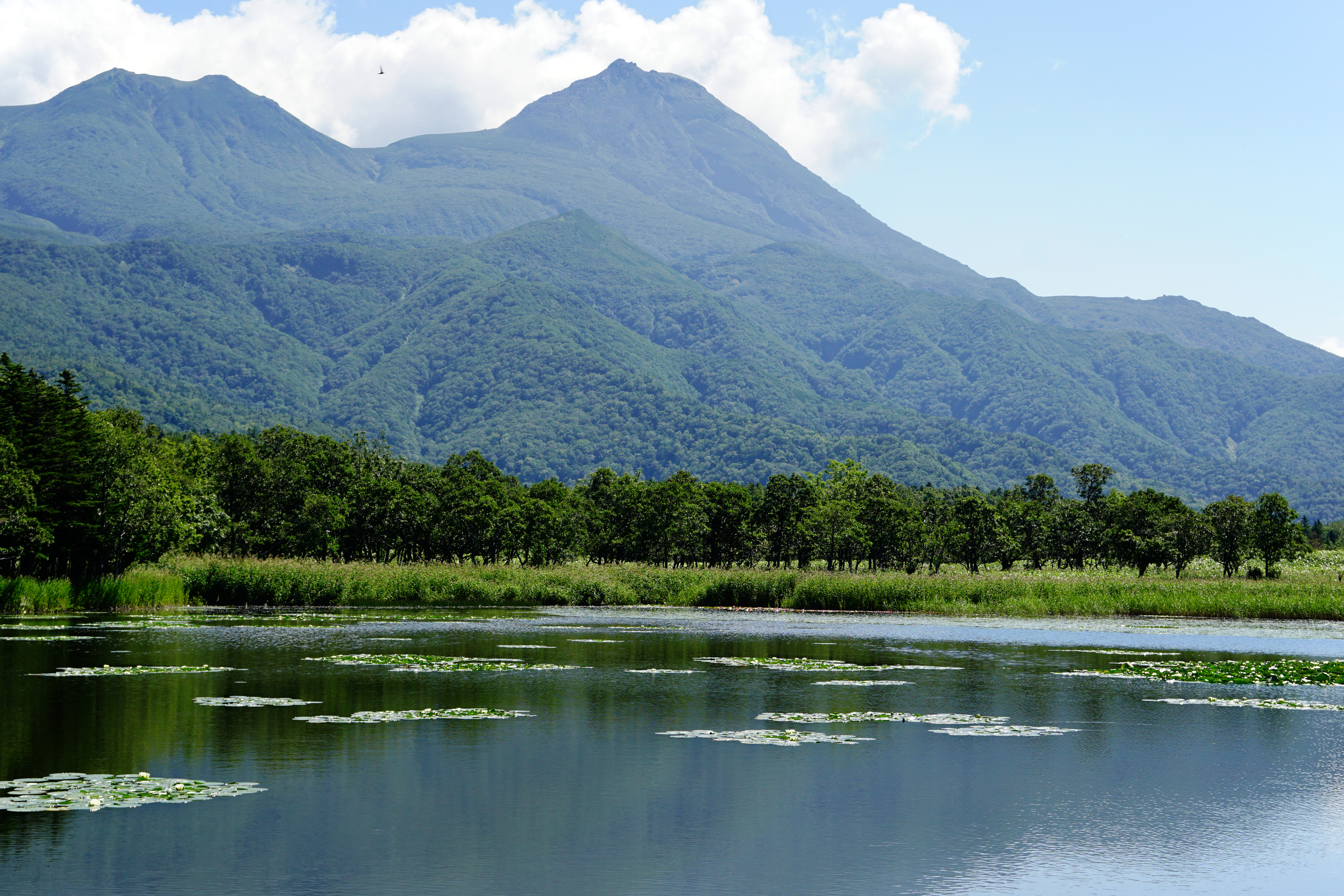
Shiretoko Goko Lakes in the town of Shari, Okhotsk Subprefecture, Hokkaidō

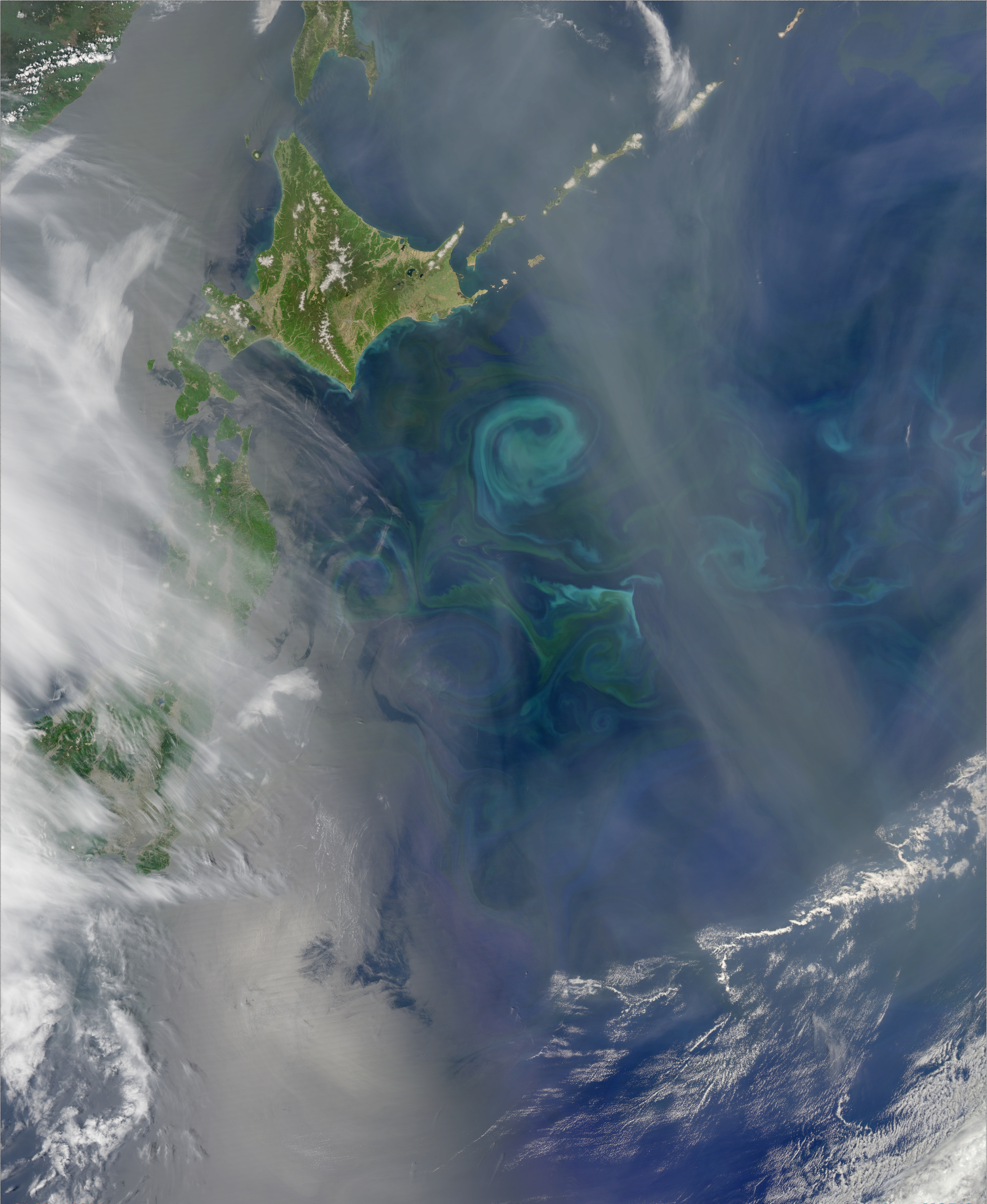
The Oyashio Current colliding with the Kuroshio Current off the coast of Hokkaido. When two currents collide, they create eddies. Phytoplankton growing in the surface waters become concentrated along the boundaries of these eddies, tracing out the motions of the water.

== See also ==
- Geography of Japan
- Kuril Islands
- Sakhalin
- Japan Trench
