= Toyotomi, Hokkaido =

Toyotomi 豊富町
- Town
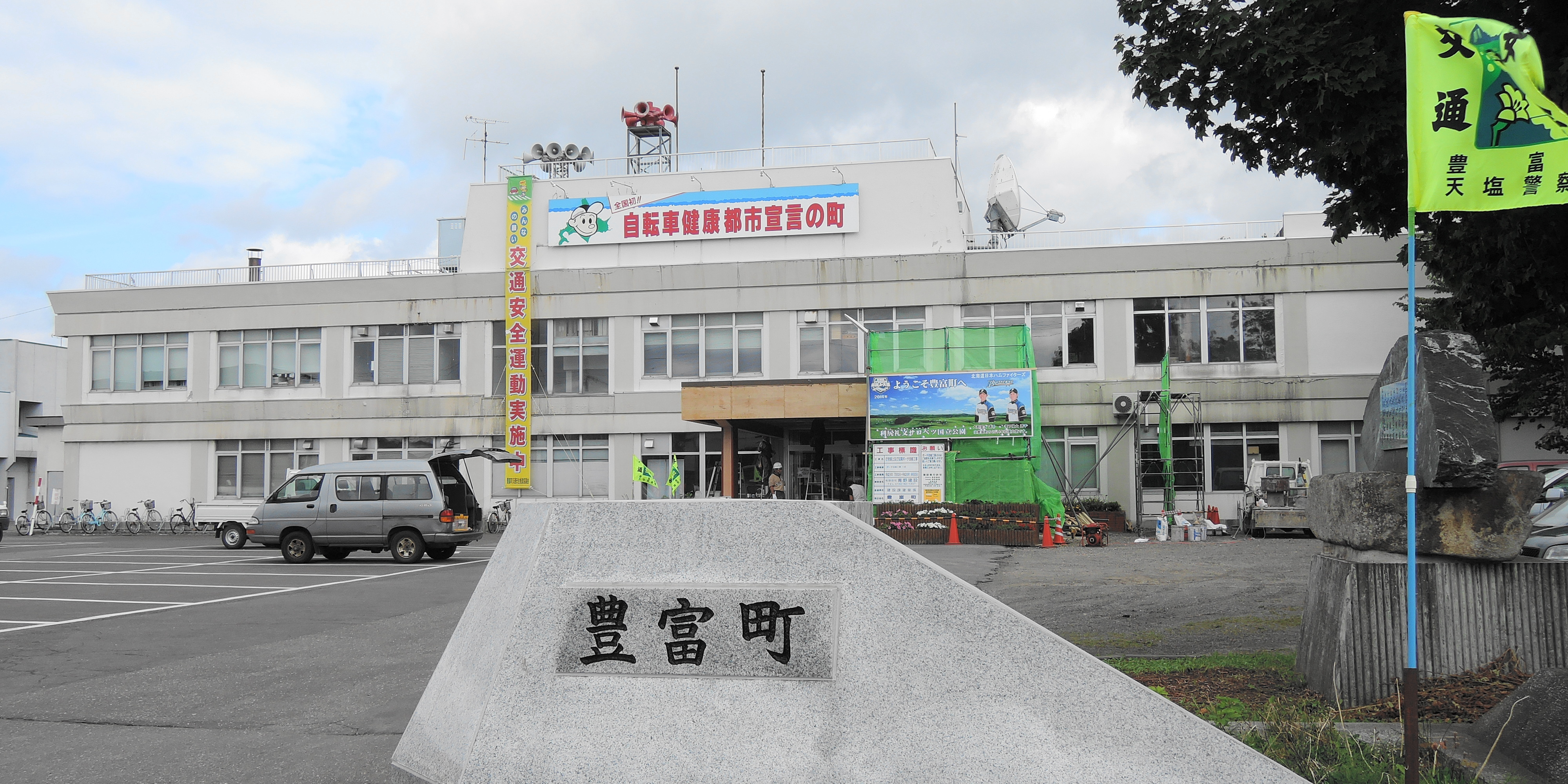
- Toyotomi town hall

- Flag Seal
- Location of Toyotomi in Hokkaido (Sōya Subprefecture)

- Location in Japan
- Coordinates: 45°6′10″N 141°46′39″E
- Country: Japan
- Region: Hokkaido
- Prefecture: Hokkaido (Sōya Subprefecture)
- District: Teshio

Government
  - Mayor: Eiji Kudō

Area
  - Total: 520.69 km^{2} (201.04 sq mi)

Population (June 30, 2024)
  - Total: 3,551
  - Density: 6.820/km^{2} (17.66/sq mi)
- Time zone: UTC+09:00 (JST)
- City hall address: Toyotomi Ōdori 6 chōme 098-4110
- Climate: Dfb
- Website: Official website
- Symbols
- Flower: Ezo-kanzō
- Tree: Japanese Yew

Toyotomi (豊富町, Toyotomi-chō) is a town located in Sōya Subprefecture, Hokkaido, Japan. As of 30 June 2024, the town had an estimated population of 3,551 in 1,932 households, and a population density of 5.8 people per km^{2}. The total area of the town is 520.69 km^{2} (201.04 sq mi).

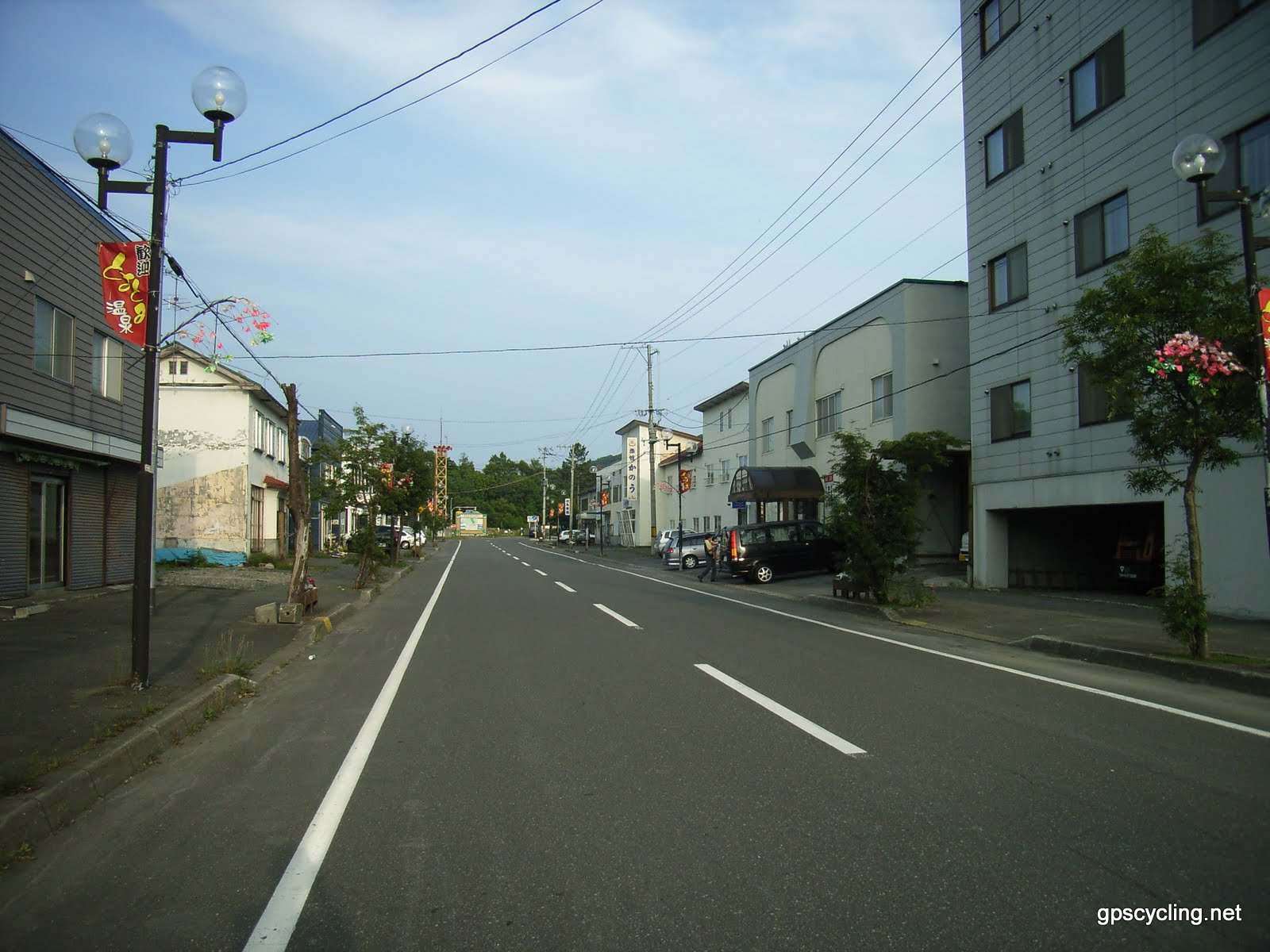
Toyotomi onsen

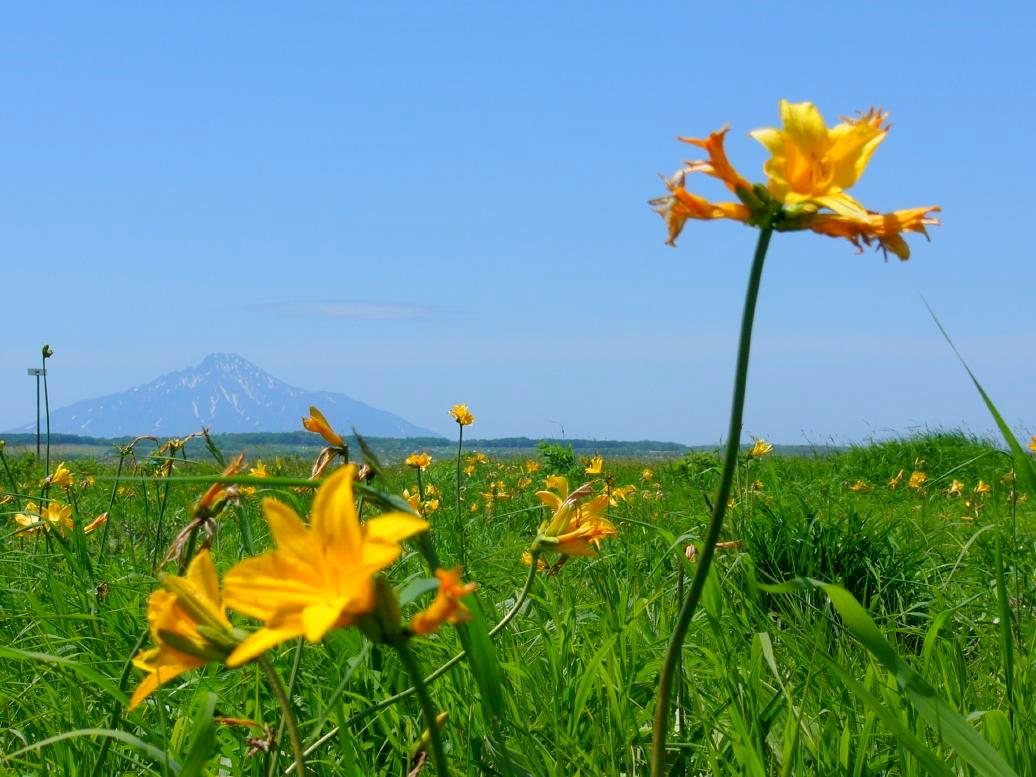
Sarobetsu Marsh

== Geography ==
Toyotomi is located at the northwest side of Sōya Subprefecture, and faces the Sea of Japan to the west. It consists of the Sarobetsu Plain, which is part of Rishiri-Rebun-Sarobetsu National Park, in the west, and gently sloping hilly and mountainous area with pastures and forests in the east. Toyotomi Onsen, the northernmost hot spring resort in Japan, is located in the mountainous area to the southeast.

- Rivers: Sarobetsu River, Shimo-Ebekorobetsu River
- Lakes: Kabutonuma Marsh, Penkenuma Marsh, Naganuma Marshes
- Mountains: Toryū Pass

=== Neighbouring municipalities ===
- Hokkaido
  - Horonobe
  - Sarufutsu
  - Wakkanai

=== Climate ===
Climate data for Toyotomi, Hokkaido, elevation 14 m (46 ft), (1991−2020 normals, extremes 1977−present)
Month	Jan	Feb	Mar	Apr	May	Jun	Jul	Aug	Sep	Oct	Nov	Dec	Year
Record high °C (°F)	7.6 (45.7)	9.6 (49.3)	13.1 (55.6)	22.7 (72.9)	26.3 (79.3)	29.3 (84.7)	32.8 (91.0)	33.1 (91.6)	30.8 (87.4)	22.5 (72.5)	17.3 (63.1)	10.6 (51.1)	33.1 (91.6)
Mean daily maximum °C (°F)	−2.9 (26.8)	−2.3 (27.9)	1.7 (35.1)	8.1 (46.6)	14.3 (57.7)	18.3 (64.9)	22.3 (72.1)	23.6 (74.5)	20.7 (69.3)	14.2 (57.6)	6.0 (42.8)	−0.6 (30.9)	10.3 (50.5)
Daily mean °C (°F)	−6.1 (21.0)	−6.1 (21.0)	−1.9 (28.6)	4.1 (39.4)	9.6 (49.3)	13.7 (56.7)	17.9 (64.2)	19.4 (66.9)	16.0 (60.8)	9.7 (49.5)	2.7 (36.9)	−3.4 (25.9)	6.3 (43.4)
Mean daily minimum °C (°F)	−10.7 (12.7)	−11.4 (11.5)	−6.5 (20.3)	−0.1 (31.8)	5.0 (41.0)	9.6 (49.3)	14.1 (57.4)	15.6 (60.1)	11.1 (52.0)	4.9 (40.8)	−0.9 (30.4)	−7.0 (19.4)	2.0 (35.6)
Record low °C (°F)	−26.5 (−15.7)	−28.8 (−19.8)	−23.2 (−9.8)	−10.6 (12.9)	−5.8 (21.6)	−1.6 (29.1)	2.9 (37.2)	3.5 (38.3)	0.4 (32.7)	−4.4 (24.1)	−13.6 (7.5)	−21.0 (−5.8)	−28.8 (−19.8)
Average precipitation mm (inches)	65.2 (2.57)	48.0 (1.89)	46.5 (1.83)	46.6 (1.83)	61.8 (2.43)	51.8 (2.04)	111.2 (4.38)	120.9 (4.76)	130.8 (5.15)	137.8 (5.43)	116.6 (4.59)	85.9 (3.38)	1,030.8 (40.58)
Average snowfall cm (inches)	195 (77)	150 (59)	112 (44)	21 (8.3)	0 (0)	0 (0)	0 (0)	0 (0)	0 (0)	1 (0.4)	56 (22)	178 (70)	703 (277)
Average extreme snow depth cm (inches)	77 (30)	88 (35)	79 (31)	31 (12)	0 (0)	0 (0)	0 (0)	0 (0)	0 (0)	1 (0.4)	18 (7.1)	52 (20)	91 (36)
Average precipitation days (≥ 1.0 mm)	18.6	14.9	12.5	9.9	9.8	9.1	9.5	9.7	11.8	15.5	17.4	19.0	157.7
Average snowy days (≥ 3.0 cm)	22.6	17.7	15.5	3.0	0	0	0	0	0	0.1	6.0	19.1	84
Mean monthly sunshine hours	46.3	74.2	125.0	149.0	169.9	139.0	126.2	137.1	161.0	122.8	55.0	27.8	1,333.5
Source 1: JMA
Source 2: JMA

=== Demographics ===
Per Japanese census data, the population of Toyotomi is as shown below. The town is in a long period of sustained population loss.

Historical population
Year	Pop.	±%
1940	7,521	—
1950	10,872	+44.6%
1960	9,595	−11.7%
1970	8,662	−9.7%
1980	6,723	−22.4%
1990	5,947	−11.5%
2000	5,220	−12.2%
2010	4,378	−16.1%
2020	3,974	−9.2%

== History ==
The area of Toyotomi was part of Teshio Province (1868–1882), a short-lived province in the north of Hokkaido. The district was historically under the control of Matsumae Domain, but in the Bakumatsu period, control was briefly transferred to Shonai Domain.

- 1869 - Japanese settlement offices open.
- 1878 - The village of Saru is founded in the location of present-day Toyotomi.
- 1909 - A government registration office is opened in the village of Horonobe, which included present-day Toyotomi.
- 1919 - The villages of Horonobe and Saru are incorporated into one village.
- 1926 - Natural gas and hot springs are discovered during mining at the present-day location of Toyotomi Onsen.
- 1936 November - The Nissō Coal Mine of Teshio is opened by Nippon Soda Co., Ltd.
- 1940 September - The village of Horonobe is separated into the villages of Horonobe and Toyotomi
- 1947 - Mitsubishi Materials begins coal-mining operations in the Toyotomi-Horonobe area.
- 1948 October - The town is moved from the administration of Rumoi Subprefecture to that of Sōya Subprefecture.
- 1950 November - The areas of Tenkō and Akebono become part of Wakkanai.
- 1959 January - Toyotomi is officially designated a township under Japanese municipal laws.
- 1972 July - Nissō Coal Mine closes.
- 1974 September - The Sarobetsu Plain is designated a national park.
- 1991 July - The town becomes the first in the country to proclaim itself a "Bicycle for Health Town".
- 2005 November - The Sarobetsu Plain is designated a Ramsar site.

=== Origin of the town's name ===
It is derived from the name "Ebekorobetsu" of the region now referred to as the Shimo-Ebekorobetsu River Valley. In Ainu, the name Ebekorobetsu (ipe-kor-pet) means "a river containing fish (food)". Because the area is rich in natural resources such as coal, petroleum, peat, and hot springs, it was named Toyotomi, which is an alternate reading of the Chinese characters for the word houfu (豊富), meaning "rich" or "abundant"

== Government ==
Toyotomi has a mayor-council form of government with a directly elected mayor and a unicameral town council of ten members. Toyotomi, as part of Soya sub-prefecture, contributes one member to the Hokkaido Prefectural Assembly. In terms of national politics, the town is part of the Hokkaido 12th district of the lower house of the Diet of Japan.

== Economy ==
The local economy of Toyotomi is centered on dairy farming, forestry, commercial fishing and tourism.

=== Farming ===
Toyotomi has a prosperous dairy industry. The area is home to over 16,000 dairy cows, meaning that the bovine population in Toyotomi is four times greater than that of the town's human population. Each year 72,000 tons of dairy milk are produced in the town, making it the largest dairy producer in Hokkaidō. Sold under the brand name of Hokkaido Sarobetsu Milk (formerly Hokkaido Toyotomi Milk), the milk produced in Toyotomi is widely consumed throughout Hokkaido. The town actively recruits and trains young people interested in becoming farmers. Businesses that produce and sell high quality food products have been growing in Toyotomi, such as Misawa Farm, which produces LTLT pasteurized-milk, Kōbō Retie, which creates authentic dairy products such as cheese and gelato, and Sarobetsu Farm, which makes ham and sausages.

=== Forestry ===
With forestland covering 52% of the town's total area, forestry is a key industry in Toyotomi. Through the implementation of the Toyotomi Forest Maintenance Plan, the town systematically preserves and maintains its forests.

=== Tourism ===
Facing a decline in population following the closing of its coal mines, the town decided to change its focus to the tourism industry. Over 30,000 people visit Toyotomi for tourism each year. Toyotomi's main tourist attraction is Japan's northernmost onsen, Toyotomi Onsen. Because the water from the onsen is considered to help with the treatment of skin disease, many skin disease sufferers seeking to heal their skin as well as tourists visit the onsen each year.

The town is home to the Sarobetsu Plain, and opportunities for coming into contact with nature are plentiful. In recent years, with the recognition of the town's vast farmlands as a source of tourism, farm restaurants and the sale of high quality dairy products have been increasing.

=== Mining ===
In the past, Toyotomi had a prosperous mining industry, in which coal, petroleum, and natural gas were produced. However, due to the decline in profitability of coal mining, Toyotomi's coal mines have since closed. The amount of petroleum buried in the area is not great enough to justify extraction operations. Natural gas emerges in the area, and in the past it was used to generate electricity which was used in Wakkanai, but due to the aging of the equipment involved and profitability issues, plant operations ceased in 1975. Currently, natural gas is still used to heat the water at Toyotomi Onsen.

=== Fishing ===
Wakasakanai Harbor is famous for the hokkigai which are caught there.

== Education ==
Toyotomi has one public elementary school, one public junior high school and one combined elementary/junior high school operated by the town government. The town has one public high school operated by the Hokkaido Board of Education.

== Transportation ==
=== Railways ===
JR Hokkaido - Sōya Main Line

■ Toyotomi - Kabutonuma

=== Highways ===
- National Route 40

== Mascot ==
Toyotomi-kun, the town's mascot

Toyotomi's mascot is Toyotomi-kun (とよとみ君). He is a simple and cute young calf. He was unveiled in 1989.
