= Sarobetsu =

Sarobetsu may refer to:

- Sarobetsu Plain in Rishiri-Rebun-Sarobetsu National Park, Japan
- Sarobetsu River in Hokkaidō, Japan
- Sarobetsu (train), a train service in Hokkaidō, Japan
