= Mount Maru (Esan) =

Active stratovolcano on the island of Hokkaido, Japan

- 丸山
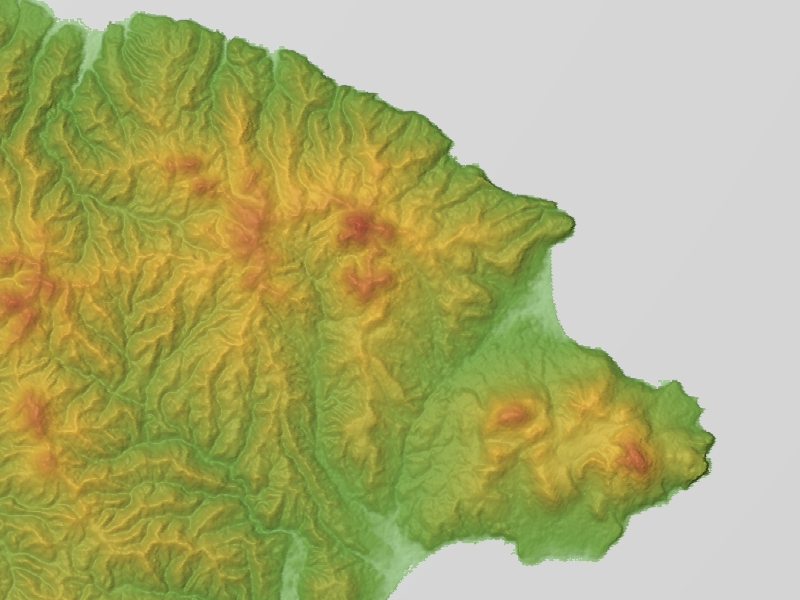
- Esan-Maruyama Volcano (left); Esan Volcano (lower right)

Highest point
- Elevation: 691.1 m (2,267 ft)
- Listing: List of mountains and hills of Japan by height
- Coordinates: 41°51′07″N 141°05′31″E

Naming
- English translation: round mountain
- Language of name: Japanese

Geography
- Location within Hokkaido
- Location: Hokkaido, Japan
- Parent range: Kameda Peninsula
- Topo map(s): Geospatial Information Authority 25000:1 尾札部; 50000:1 尻屋崎

Geology
- Rock age: Late Miocene to mid Pleistocene
- Mountain type: stratovolcano
- Last eruption: 200 thousand years ago

Mount Maru (丸山, Maru-yama) is an active stratovolcano of the Kameda peninsula. It is located in Hakodate, Hokkaidō, Japan. Mount Maru is also known as Esan Maruyama (恵山丸山) to distinguish it from other Mount Maru's and because of its close association with nearby Mount E.

== Geology ==
Mount Maru consists of non-alkali, mafic, volcanic rock. The andesitic volcano is topped with a lava dome.

== Eruptive history ==
Mount Maru was last active some 200,000 years ago.
