= Mount E =

Active stratovolcano on the island of Hokkaido, Japan

- 恵山
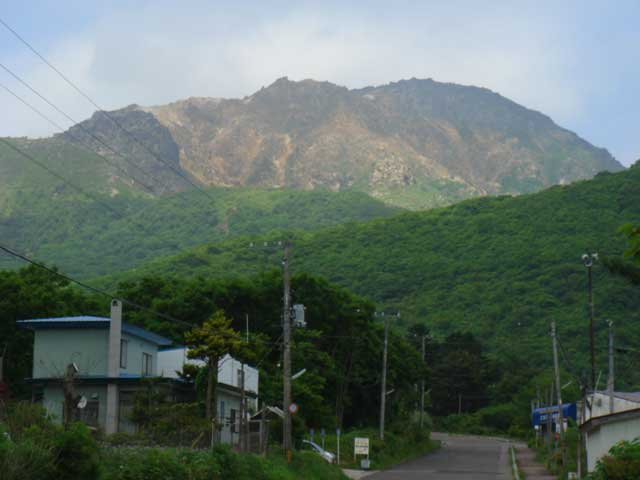

Highest point
- Elevation: 617.6 m (2,026 ft)
- Listing: List of mountains and hills of Japan by height List of volcanoes in Japan
- Coordinates: 41°48′17″N 141°09′58″E

Naming
- Language of name: Japanese

Geography
- Location within Hokkaido Location within Japan
- Location: Hokkaido, Japan
- Parent range: Kameda Peninsula
- Topo map(s): Geospatial Information Authority 25000:1 恵山; 50000:1 尻屋崎

Geology
- Rock age: Pleistocene
- Mountain type: Stratovolcano
- Volcanic arc: Northeastern Japan Arc
- Last eruption: June 1874

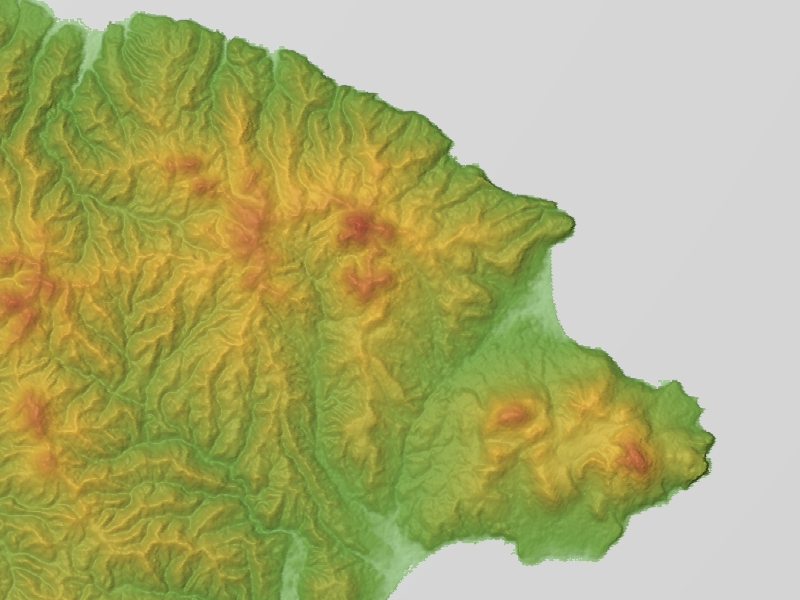
Esan Volcano(lower right), Esan-Maruyama Volcano(left)

Mount E (恵山, E-san) is an active stratovolcano of the Kameda peninsula, which is itself part of the larger Oshima Peninsula. It is in the rural, eastern region of Hakodate, Hokkaido, Japan. Mount E is part of Esan Prefectural Natural Park.

== Geology ==
Mount E consists of non-alkali, mafic, volcanic rock. The andesitic volcano is topped with a lava dome.

== Eruptive history ==
Mount E last erupted on June 8, 1874. This eruption consisted of phreatic explosions, and was rated a 1 on the VEI scale.

The oldest recorded eruption started November 18, 1846. The eruption triggered lahars damaging several houses and causing fatalities.

Radiocarbon dating and tephrochronology indicate five other eruptions predating the historical records in the approximate years 1350, 550 BC, 1050 BC, 3900 BC ±100 years, 7050 BC. The eruption in 7050 BC was the largest with a VEI of 3.
