= Kariba-Motta Prefectural Natural Park =

Natural park in Hokkaido, Japan

Coordinates: 42°36′48″N 139°56′26″E

- 狩場茂津多道立自然公園
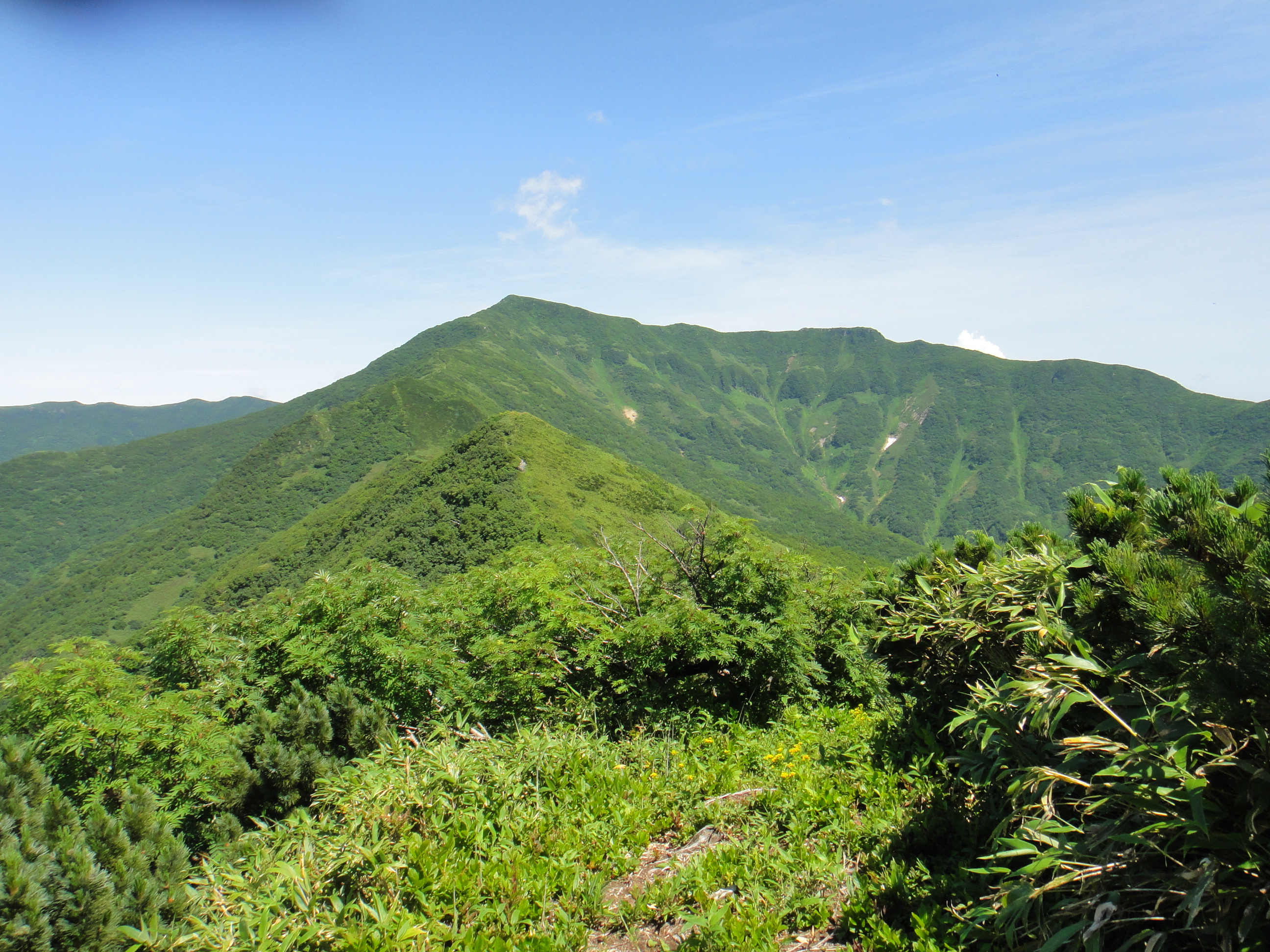
- Mount Kariba
- Interactive map of Kariba-Motta Prefectural Natural Park
- Location: Hokkaidō, Japan
- Area: 226.47 km^{2} (87.44 sq mi)
- Established: 1972

Kariba-Motta Prefectural Natural Park (狩場茂津多道立自然公園, Kariba-Motta dōritsu shizen kōen) is a Prefectural Natural Park in southwest Hokkaidō, Japan. Established in 1972, the park spans the municipalities of Setana, Shimamaki, and Suttsu.

== See also ==
- National Parks of Japan
