= Teshiodake Prefectural Natural Park =

Natural park in Hokkaido, Japan

- 天塩岳道立自然公園
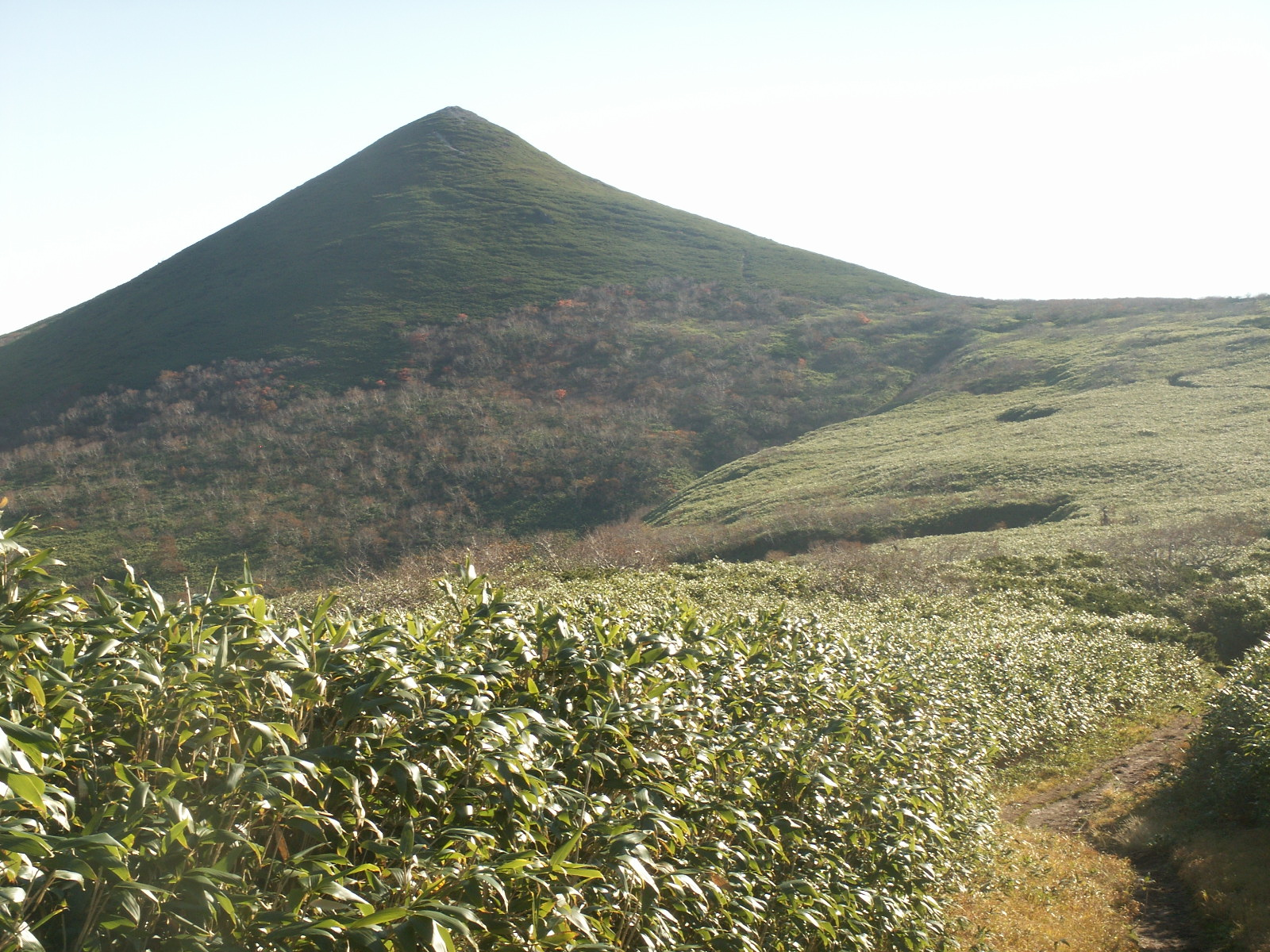
- Mount Teshio (1,557.6 m)
- Interactive map of Teshiodake Prefectural Natural Park
- Location: Hokkaidō, Japan
- Established: 6 January 1978

Teshiodake Prefectural Natural Park (天塩岳道立自然公園, Teshiodake dōritsu shizen kōen) is a Prefectural Natural Park in northern Hokkaidō, Japan. The park was established in 1978.

== See also ==
- National Parks of Japan
