= Tokachi Plain =

Coastal Plain in Southeastern Hokkaido

Coordinates: 43°0′N 143°30′E

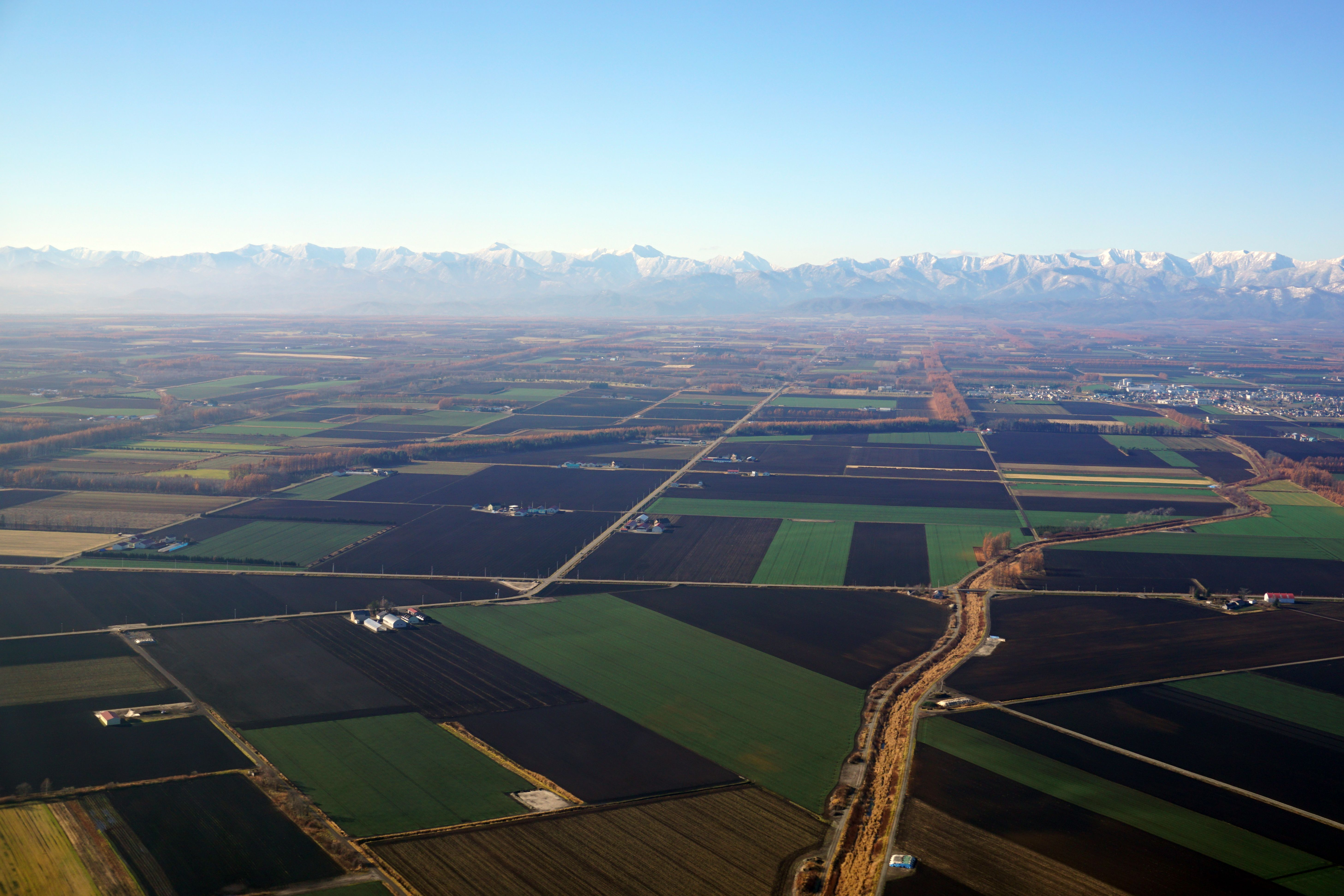
Large farms on the Tokachi Plain near Obihiro

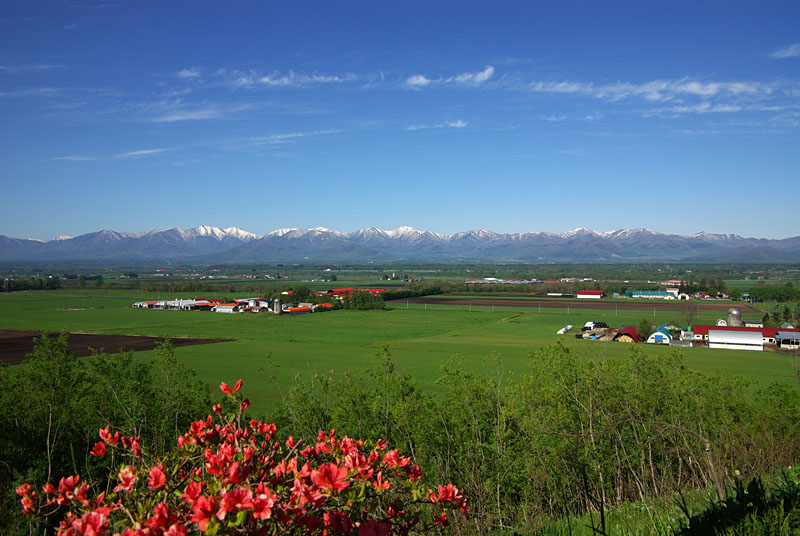
Tokachi Plain

Tokachi Plain (Japanese: 十勝平野) is a plain facing the Pacific Ocean, located in the southeastern part of Hokkaido. The area of the plain is approximately 3600km^{2}.

Matsuura Takeshirō invented the name "Tokachi" based on the Ainu word tokapci (トカㇷ゚チ), meaning a breast, possibly referring to a breast-shaped hill.
