= Matsumae Yagoshi Prefectural Natural Park =

Natural park in Hokkaido, Japan

- 松前矢越道立自然公園
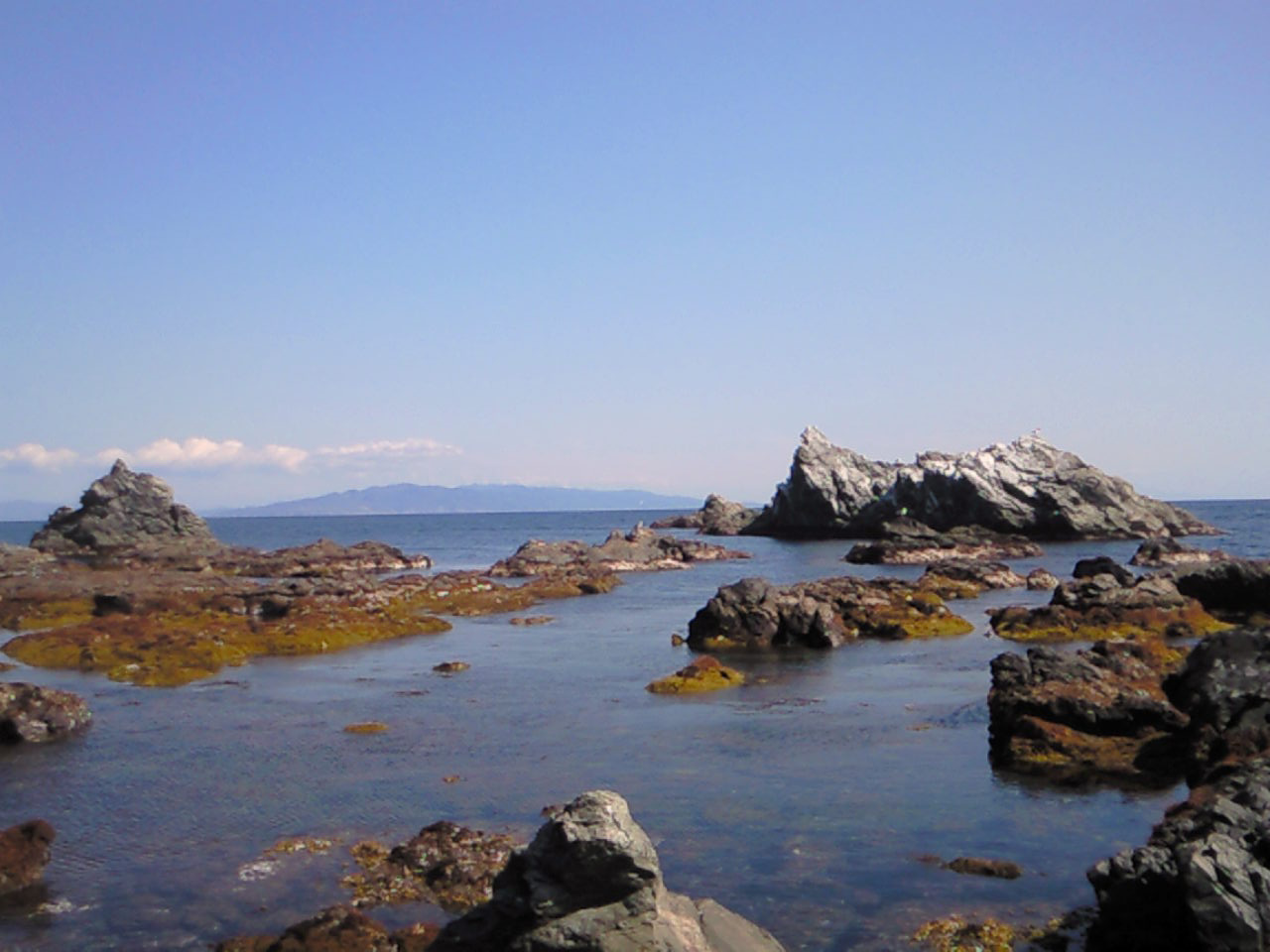
- Cape Shirakami
- Interactive map of Matsumae Yagoshi Prefectural Natural Park
- Location: Hokkaidō, Japan
- Area: 20.52 km^{2} (7.92 sq mi)
- Established: 15 May 1968

Matsumae Yagoshi Prefectural Natural Park (松前矢越道立自然公園, Matsumae Yagoshi dōritsu shizen kōen) is a Prefectural Natural Park in southwest Hokkaidō, Japan. Established in 1968, the park spans the municipalities of Fukushima, Matsumae, and Shiriuchi.

== See also ==
- National Parks of Japan
