= Esan Prefectural Natural Park =

Natural park in Hokkaido, Japan

- 恵山道立自然公園
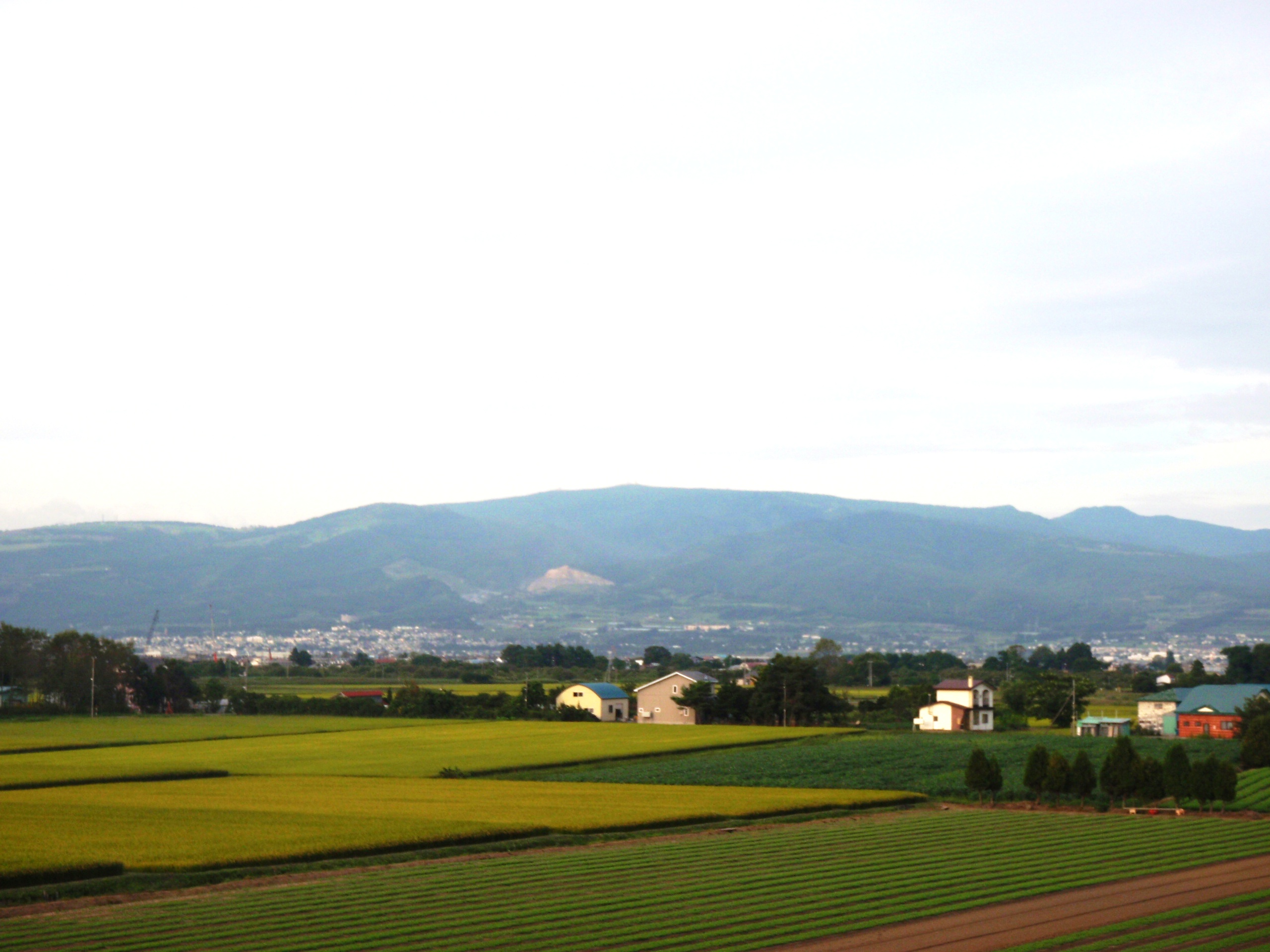
- Mount Yokotsu
- Interactive map of Esan Prefectural Natural Park
- Location: Hokkaidō, Japan
- Nearest city: Hakodate
- Coordinates: 41°48′N 141°09′E
- Area: 41.16 square kilometres (15.89 mi^{2})
- Established: 1961

Esan Prefectural Natural Park (恵山道立自然公園, Esan dōritsu shizen kōen) is a Prefectural Natural Park in southwest Hokkaidō, Japan. Established in 1961, the park is within the municipality of Hakodate on the Oshima Peninsula. The park comprises four main areas, namely coast, forest, and Mounts E and Yokotsu (横津岳).
