= Sarobetsu Plain =

Coastal plain in Northwestern Hokkaido

Designations

Ramsar Wetland
- Official name: Sarobetsu-genya
- Designated: 8 November 2005
- Reference no.: 1555

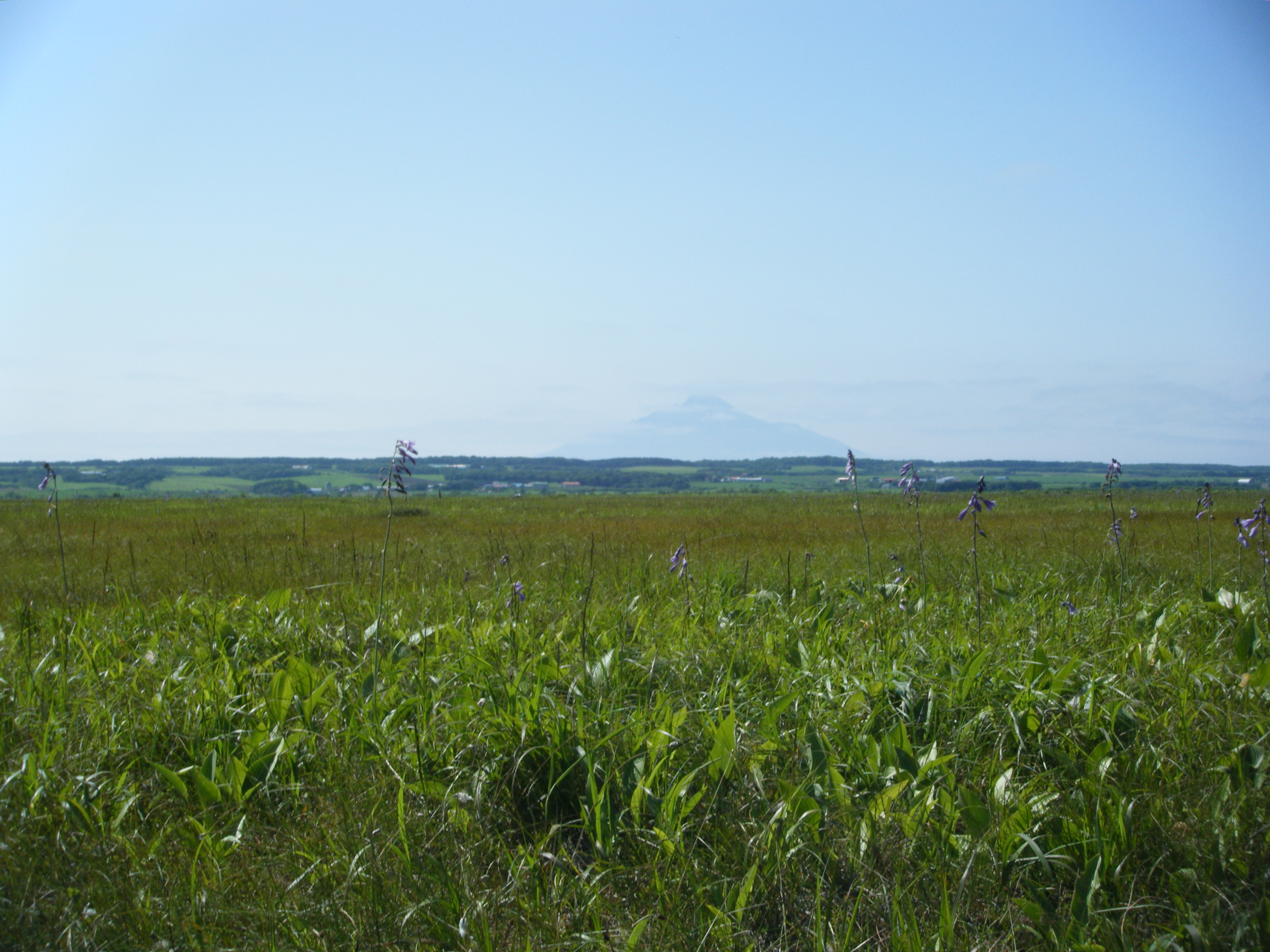
Sarobetsu-genya

The Sarobetsu Plain (サロベツ原野), derived from the Ainu sar (marsh) and pet (river), is a coastal plain and low-lying moor in northwestern Hokkaidō, Japan. With an area of approximately 20,000 ha or 200 km^{2} (77 mi^{2}), it forms part of the Rishiri-Rebun-Sarobetsu National Park, and its wetlands are a Ramsar Site.

== See also ==
- Rishiri-Rebun-Sarobetsu National Park
- Ramsar sites in Japan
