= Rishiri-Rebun-Sarobetsu National Park =

National park in Hokkaidō, Japan

- 利尻礼文サロベツ国立公園
- IUCN category II (national park)
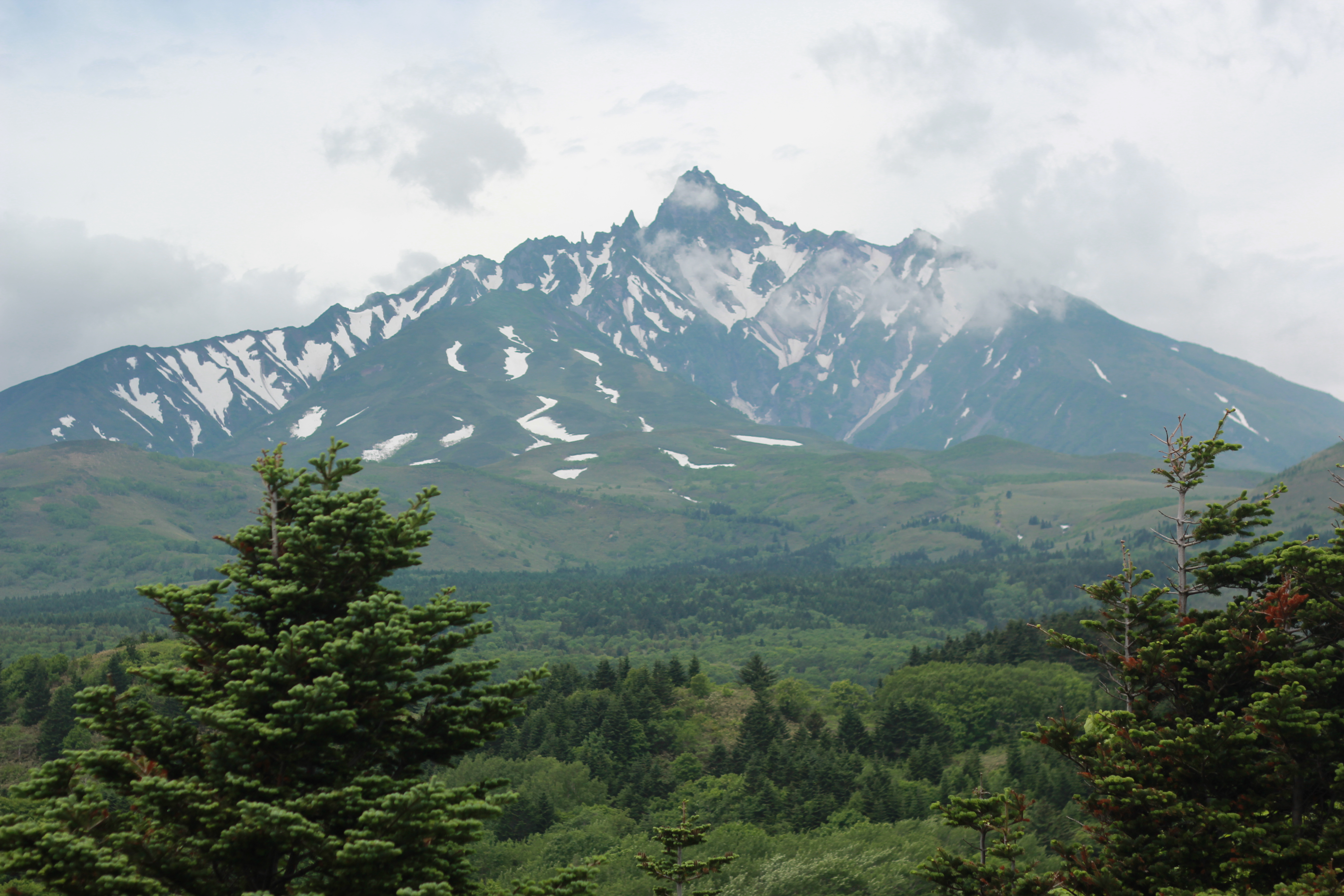
- Mount Rishiri

- Location within Hokkaido Location within Japan
- Location: Hokkaidō, Japan
- Nearest city: Wakkanai
- Coordinates: 45°11′38″N 141°15′29″E
- Area: 241.66 km^{2} (93.31 sq mi)
- Established: September 20, 1974
- Governing body: Ministry of the Environment (Japan)

Ramsar Wetland
- Official name: Sarobetsu-genya
- Designated: 8 November 2005
- Reference no.: 1555

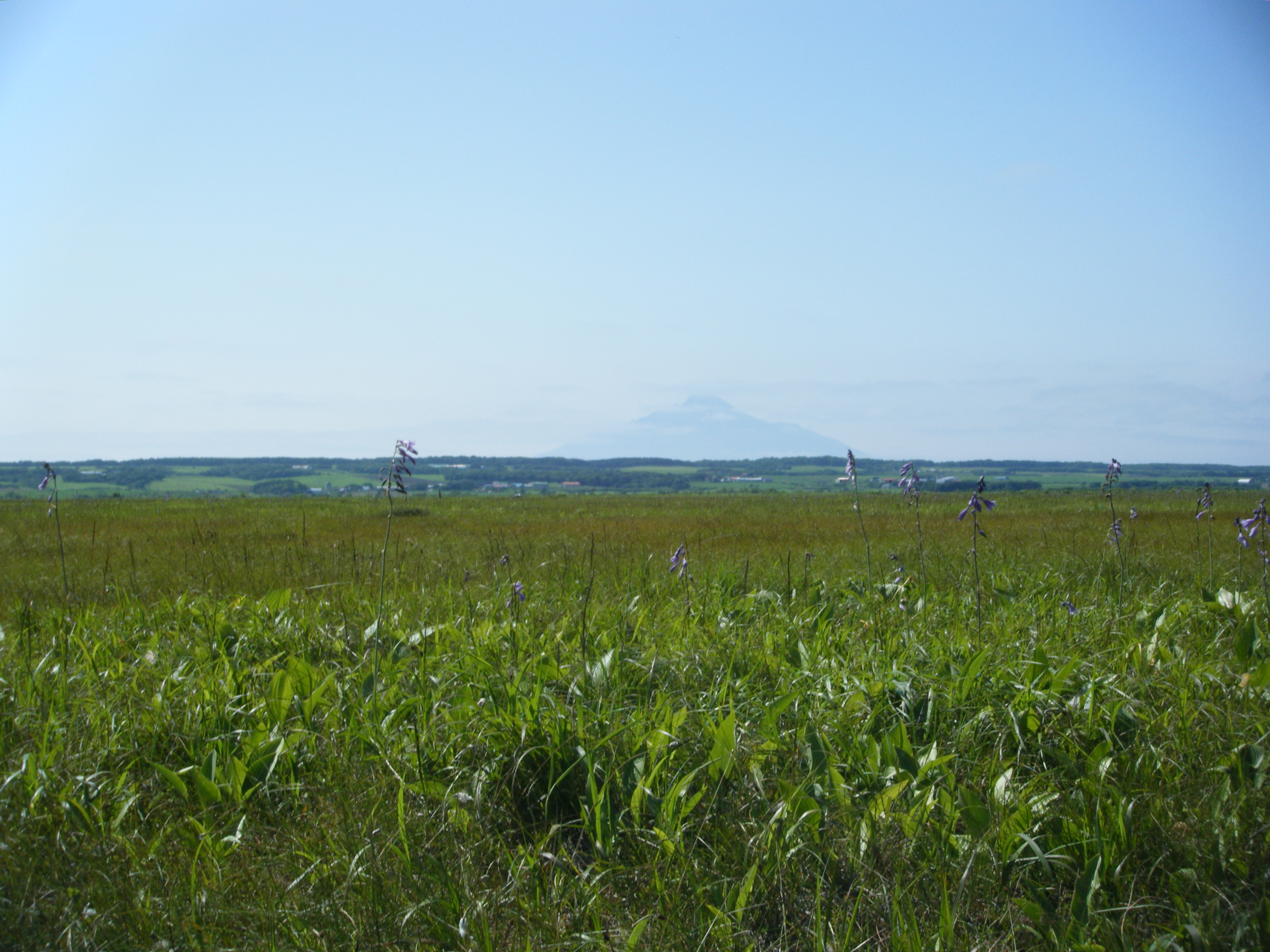
Hokkaido, Sarobetsu Plain

Rishiri-Rebun-Sarobetsu National Park (利尻礼文サロベツ国立公園, Rishiri Rebun Sarobetsu Kokuritsu Kōen) is a national park on the Rishiri Island, Rebun Island, and a coastal area from Wakkanai to Horonobe at the north-western tip of Hokkaidō, Japan. Areas of the park cover 212.22 square kilometres (81.94 mi^{2}). The park is noted for its alpine flora and views of volcanic mountains and areas formed by marine erosion. The park is surrounded by fishing grounds, and the coastal areas of the park are rich in kelp. The coastal areas of the national park can be accessed from Japan National Route 40, known as the Wakkanai National Highway, and the Rishiri and Rebun are accessible by ferry from Wakkanai.

== Geography ==
=== Rishiri Island ===
Rishiri Island (利尻島, Rishiri-tō), separated from Hokkaido by the Rishiri Channel, was formed by the cone-shaped extinct volcanic peak of Mount Rishiri (1,721 metres (5,646 ft)). The island is 63 kilometres (39 mi) in circumference and covers 183 square kilometres (71 mi^{2}).

=== Rebun Island ===
Rebun Island (礼文島, Rebun-tō) is approximately 30 kilometres (19 mi) west of Wakkanai in Hokkaido. The island is 72 kilometres (45 mi) in circumference and covers 82 square kilometres (32 mi^{2}). Rebun reaches its highest altitude at Rebundake.

=== Sarobetsu Plain ===
The Sarobetsu Plain (サロベツ原野, Sarobetsu Gen'ya) is a marshy floodplain on the Sea of Japan formed by the Teshio River and Sarobetsu River. The plain is approximately 17 kilometres (11 mi) long and covers approximately 150 square kilometres (58 mi^{2}). The Sarobetsu Plain has a subarctic climate and consists of large peat bogs. The Sarobetsu Plain was added to the Ramsar List of Wetlands of International Importance in 2005 as part of the Ramsar Convention, an international treaty for the conservation of wetlands.

== See also ==
- List of national parks of Japan
- Rishiri Island
- Rebun Island
- Sarobetsu Plain
