= 三松 =

三松, meaning "three, plum", may refer to:

- Mimatsu, Japanese surname
  - Masao Mimatsu (1888–1977), Japanese postmaster
  - 8728 Mimatsu, an asteroid named after Mimatsu
- Mitsumatsu Station (Fukui), railway station of the West Japan Railway Company (JR West)
- Samsong station, subway station on Seoul Subway Line 3

== See also ==
- The dictionary definition of 三 at Wiktionary
- The dictionary definition of 松 at Wiktionary
