= Usuzan Ropeway =

Aerial lift line in Sōbetsu, Hokkaidō, Japan

Coordinates: 42°32′22.8″N 140°51′10″E

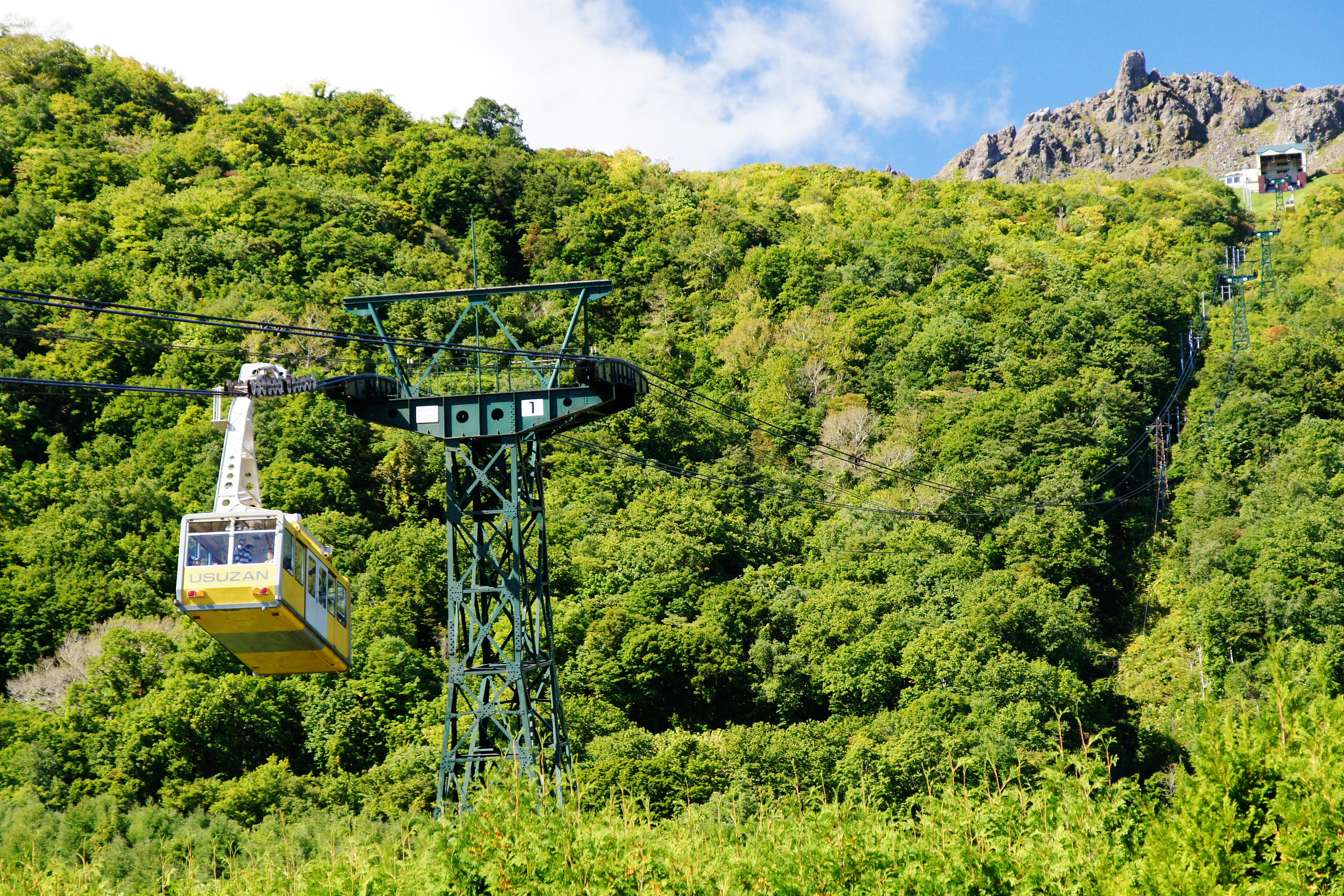
Usuzan Ropeway

The Usuzan Ropeway (有珠山ロープウェイ, Usuzan Rōpuwei) is a Japanese aerial lift line in Sōbetsu, Hokkaidō, operated by Wakasa Resort (ワカサリゾート). Opened in 1965, the line climbs Mount Usu, the active volcano in Shikotsu-Tōya National Park. The observatory has a view of Lake Tōya, Shōwa Shinzan, and the central crater of Mount Usu. The ropeway provides access to hiking trails that lead to several crater viewing platforms of the volcanic landscape formed by past eruptions.

== Basic data ==
- System: Aerial tramway, 2 track cables and 2 haulage ropes
- Cable length: 1.3 kilometres (0.8 mi)
- Vertical interval: 353 m (1,158 ft)
- Passenger capacity per a cabin: 106
- Cabins: 2
- Stations: 2
- Duration of one-way trip: 6 minutes

== Gallery ==
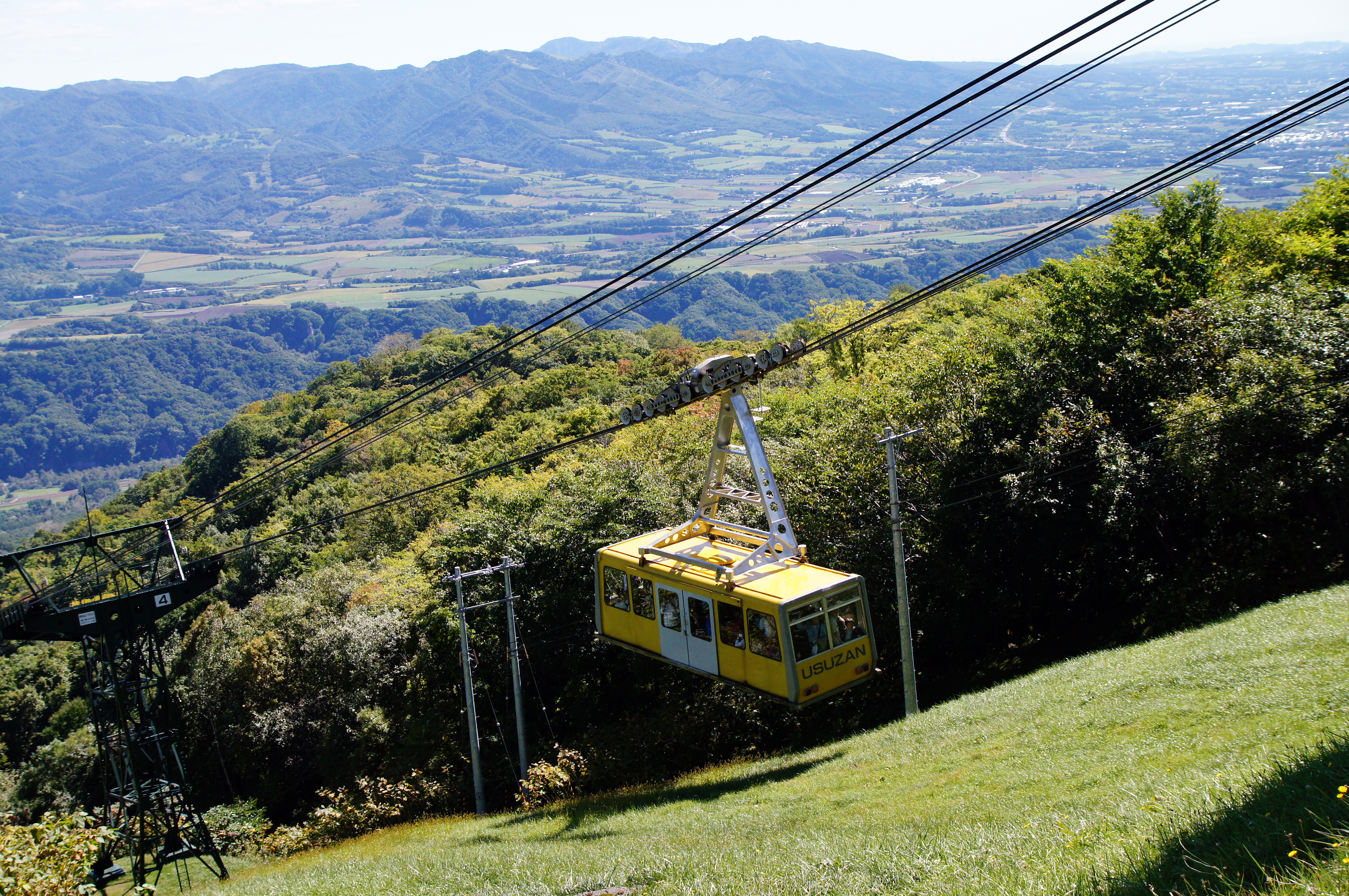

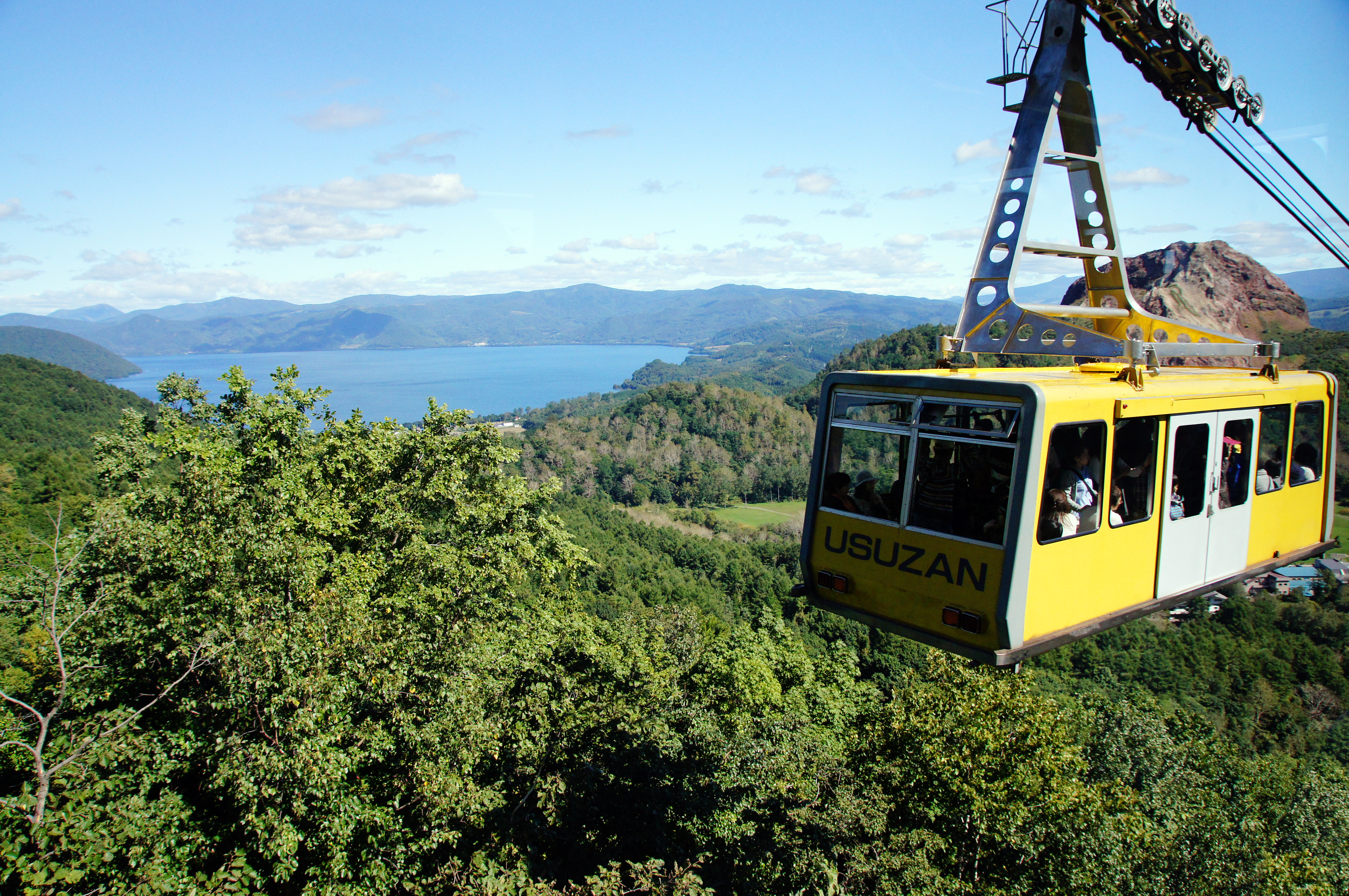
Lake Tōya view from Usuzan Ropeway

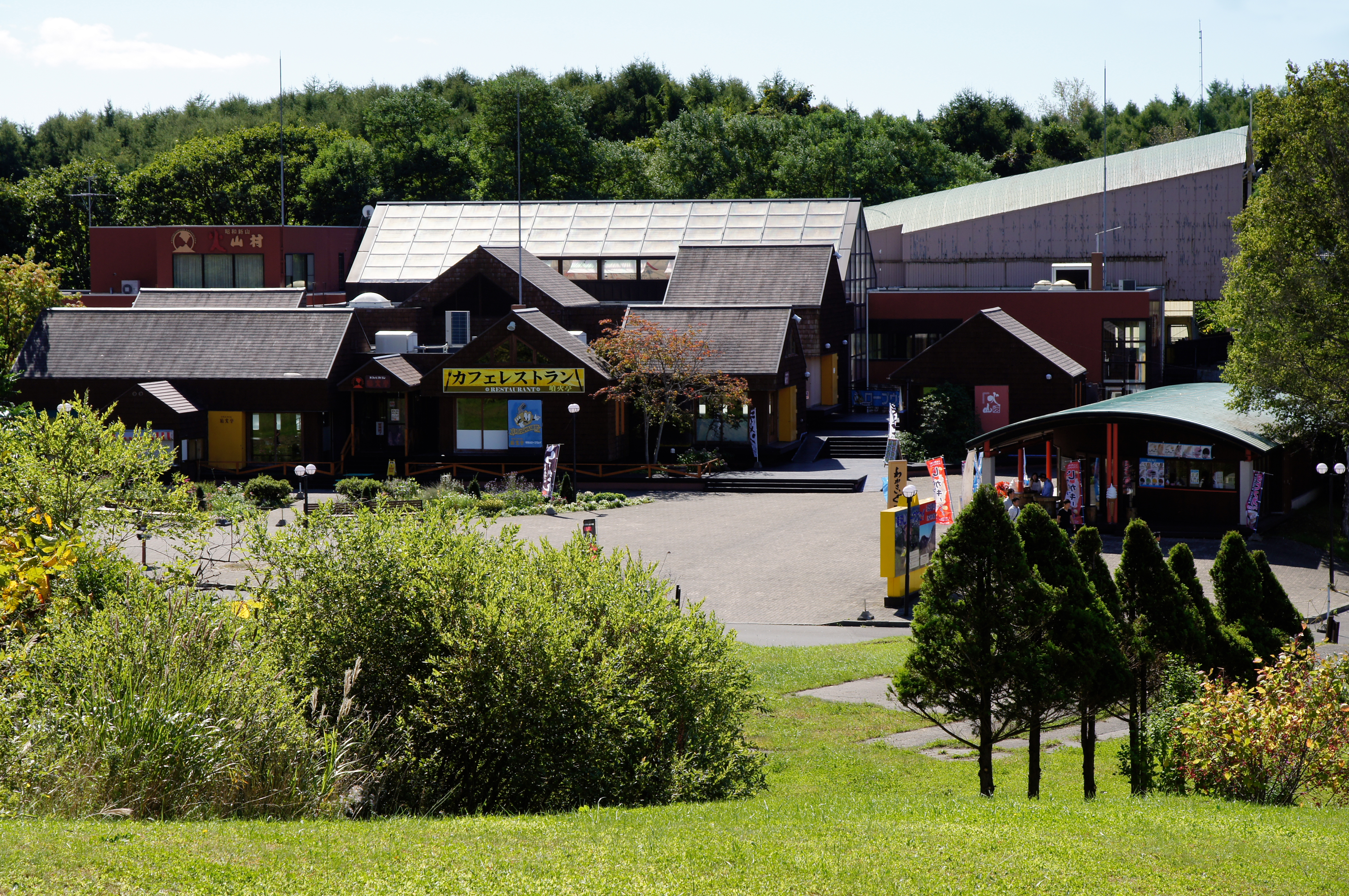
Foot of the mountain station 山麓駅 (Sanroku)

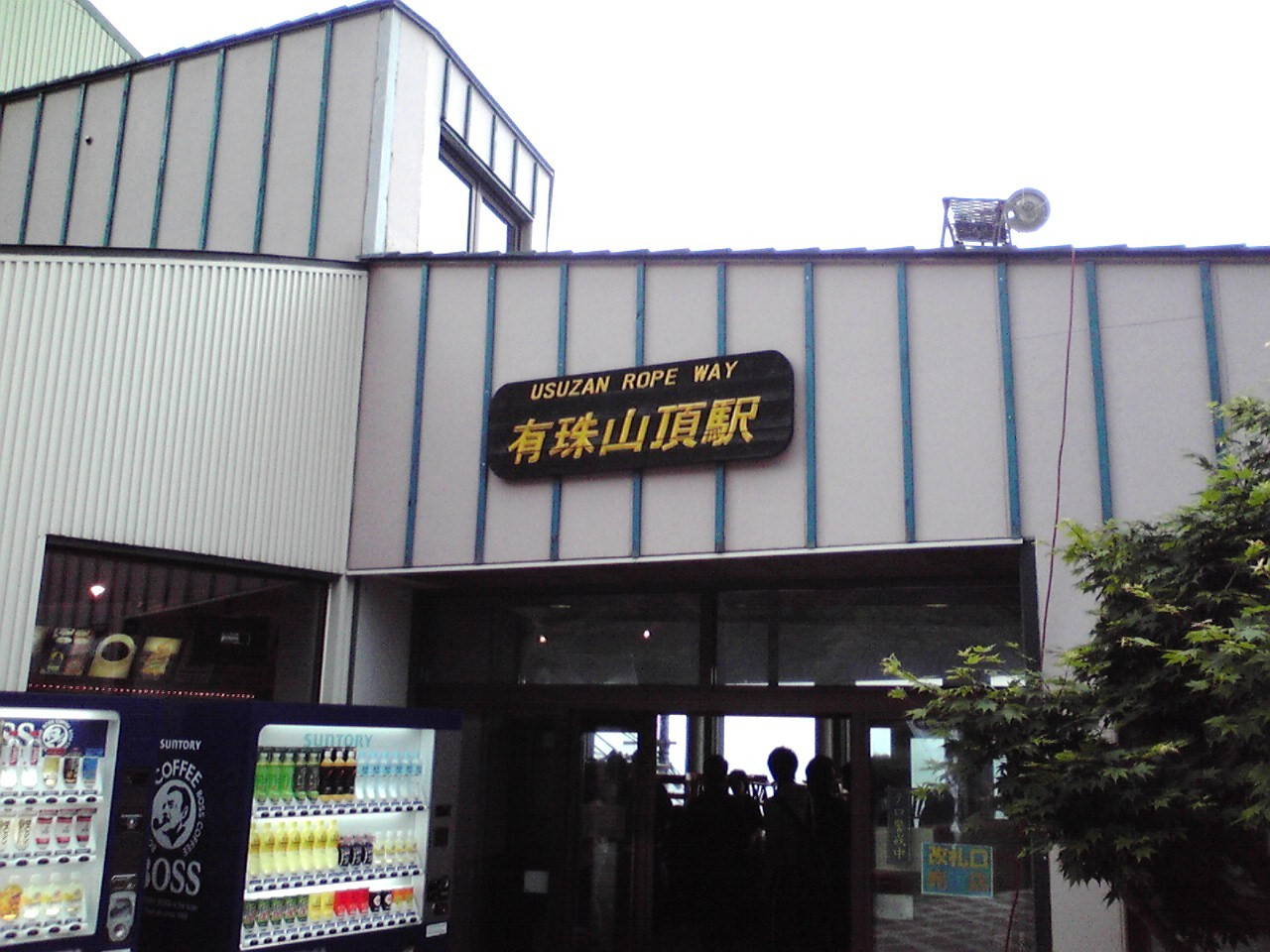
Top of the mountain station 山頂駅 (Sanchō-eki)

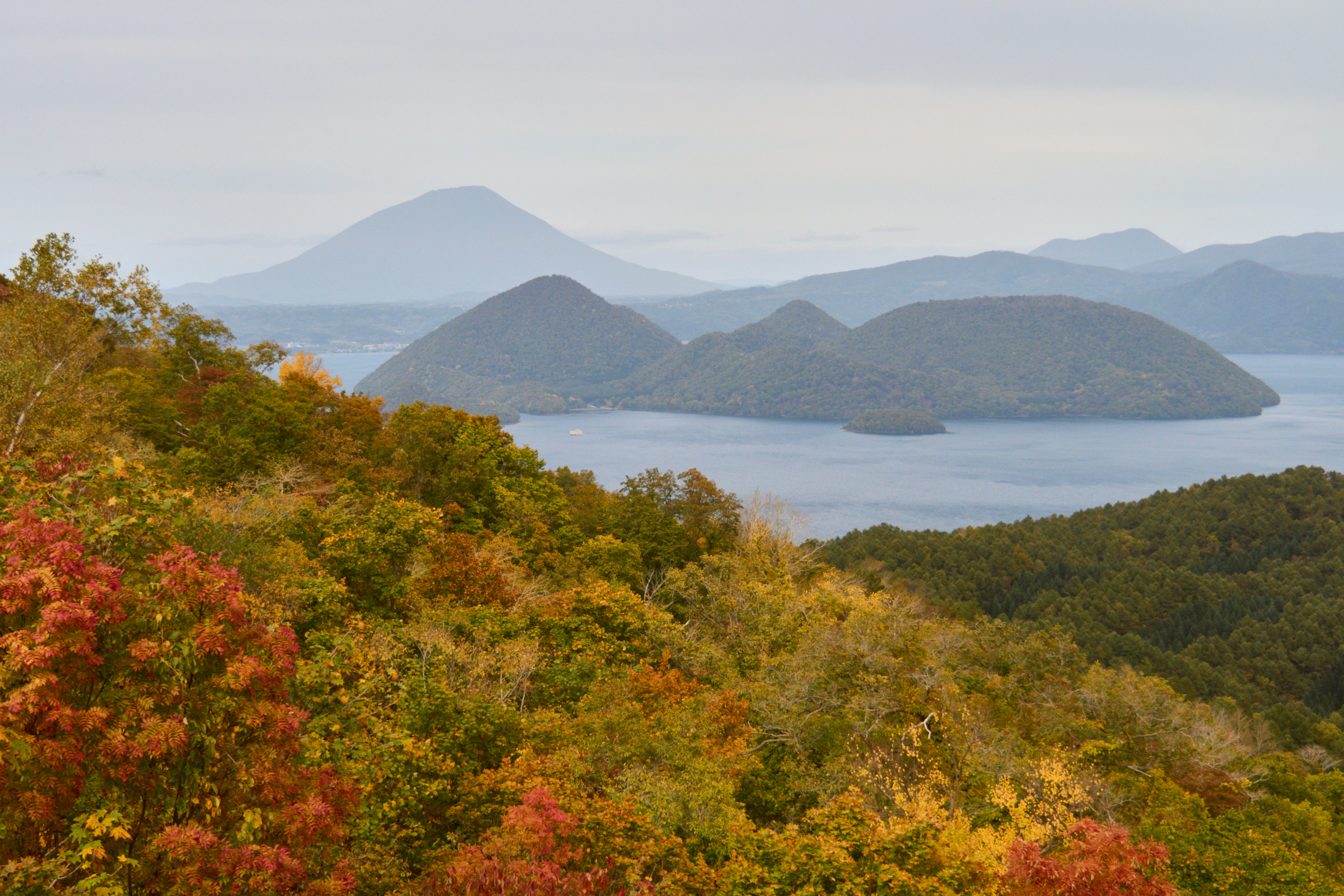
Lake Toya and Mt. Yotei from Usuzan Ropeway in autumn

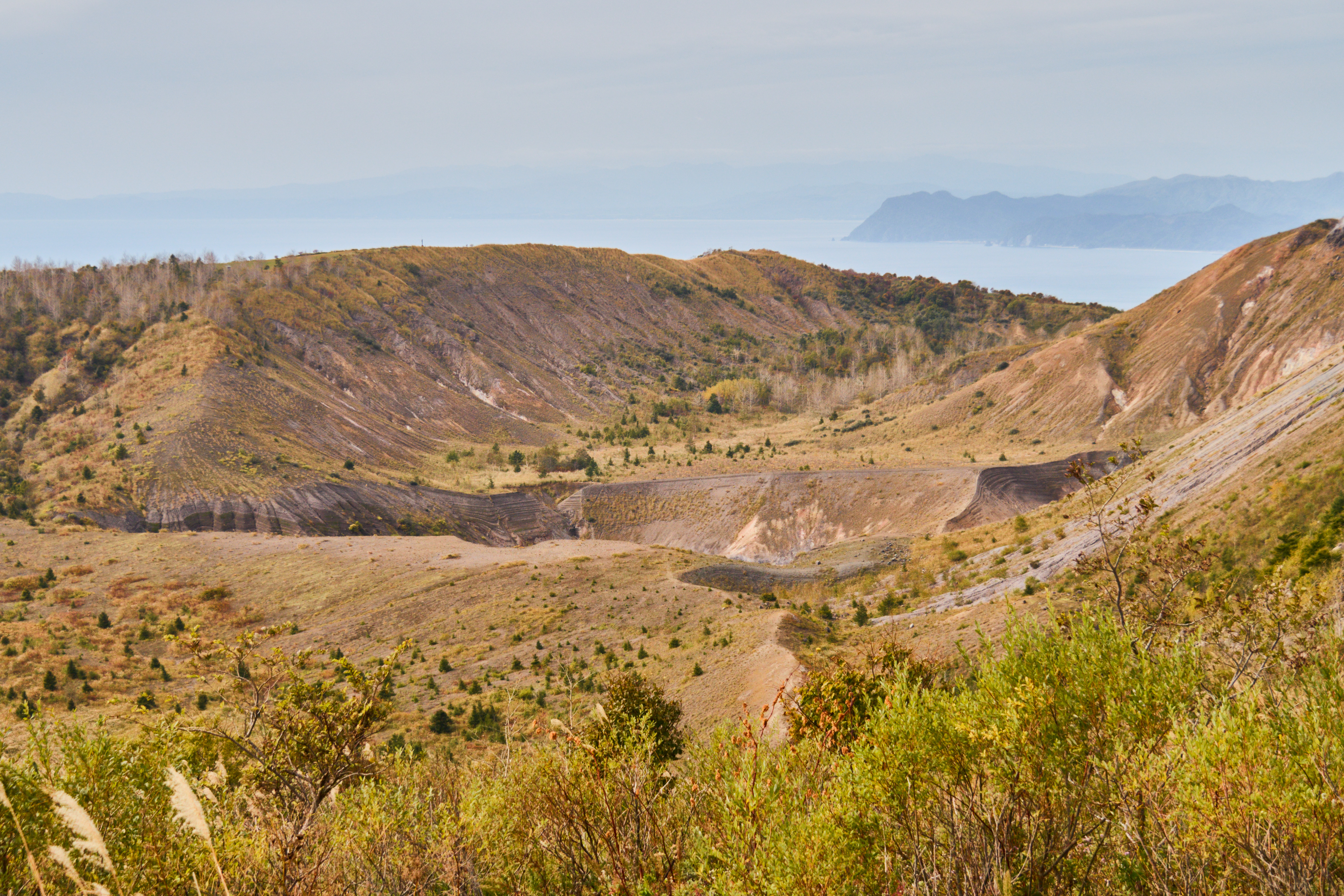
Crater viewed from Mt. Usu

== See also ==
- List of aerial lifts in Japan
