= Masao Mimatsu =

Japanese postmaster

Masao Mimatsu (三松正夫; 9 July 1888 – 8 December 1977) was a Japanese postmaster who recorded the growth of the Shōwa-shinzan mountain in 1944–1945.

On 31 December 1943, Shōwa-shinzan began forming from rapid uplifting of a wheat field as a result of a sudden earthquake. This seismic event would eventually change into volcanic activity and result in the eruption of Mount Usu in 1944.

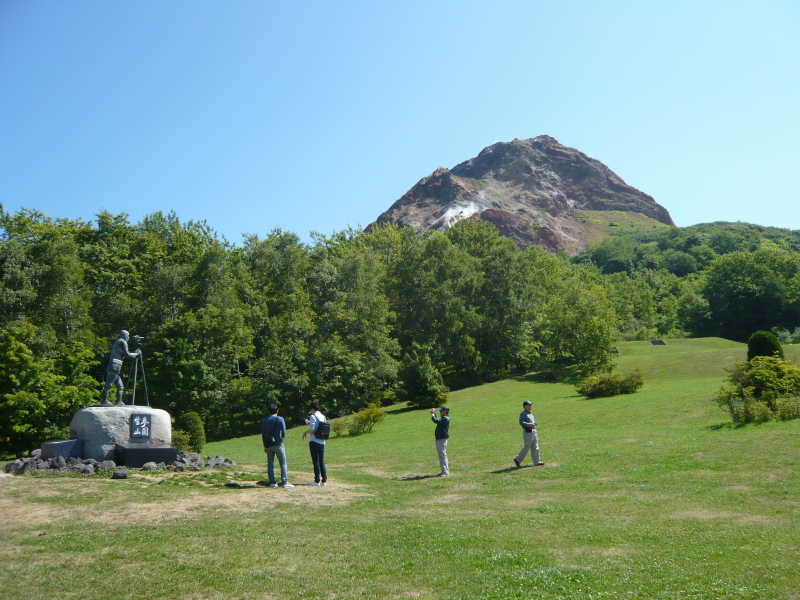
A statue of Mimatsu at the base of Mount Usu

Due to the Japanese war effort, basic scientific materials were unavailable. However, Mimatsu, the postmaster of Sobetsu-cho, recorded measurements and drew diagrams of the rising mountain on paper.

The story goes that in 1946, in order to study the volcano more thoroughly, he bought up the land using all of his savings and became owner of the volcano.

A conflicting story described in Time on Monday, 4 July 1949 indicates this purchase to be around 1944, and to have happened as a result of pressure from the villagers of Fukaba. Whatever the reasons, what Mimatsu gleaned from his "pet volcano" would be the basis for much understanding in years to come.

Despite his amateur status, when he presented his data and sketches to the World Volcano Conference in Oslo in 1948, his work was praised by professional volcanologists. His papers were referred to as the "Mimatsu Diagram" (ja) and for them he received the First Hokkaido Cultural Award. In 1977, he was able to witness the third eruption of Mt. Usu in his lifetime. However, he died of illness on December 8 of the same year without being able to witness the end of the eruptive event.

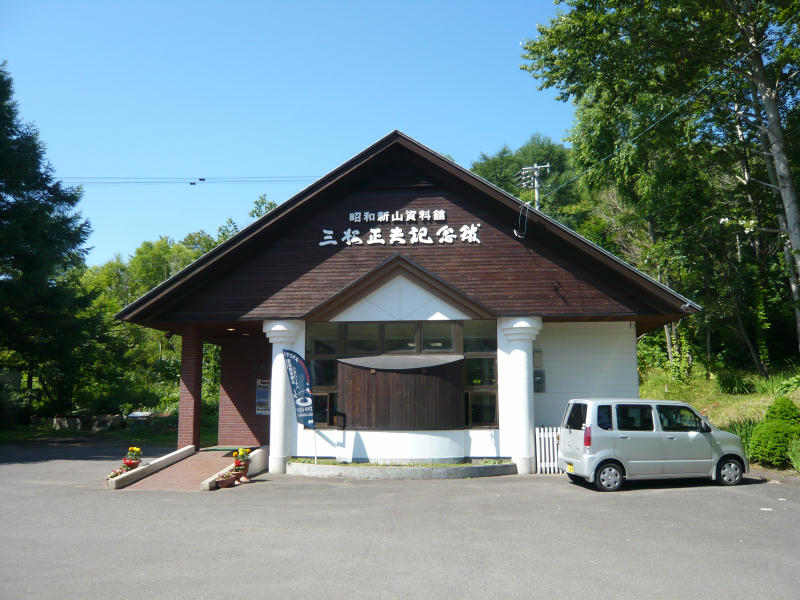
The Mimatsu Masao Memorial Hall

He is now honoured by a statue at the base of Usuzan, and his work is celebrated in the Mimatsu Masao Memorial Hall near the site of Shōwa-shinzan.

== See also ==
- 8728 Mimatsu, an asteroid named after Mimatsu
- The Thief Akikazu Inoue, a manga by Osamu Tezuka, with the titular story based on Mimatsu's biography
