= Mount Usu =

Active volcano in Hokkaido, Japan

- 有珠山 Usu-zan
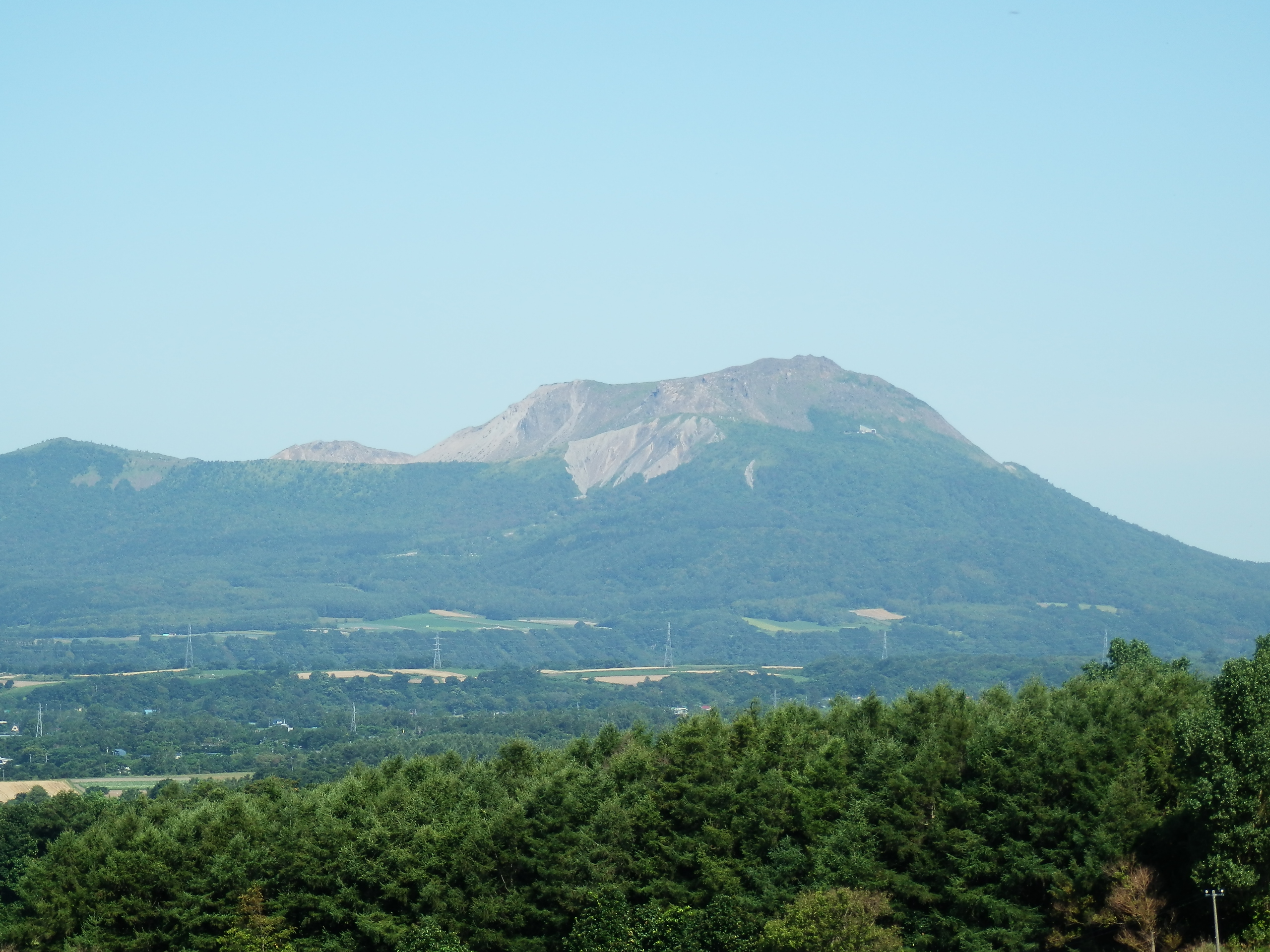
- Viewed from the SE.

Highest point
- Elevation: 733 m (2,405 ft)
- Listing: Mountains of Japan
- Coordinates: 42°32′37″N 140°50′21″E

Geography
- Location within Hokkaido
- Location: Hokkaidō, Japan
- Parent range: Nasu Volcanic Zone
- Topo map(s): Geographical Survey Institute 25,000:1 壮瞥, 50,000:1 虻田

Geology
- Mountain type: Stratovolcano
- Rock types: Basalt; Andesite; Dacite; Rhyolite
- Volcanic arc: Northeast Japan Arc
- Last eruption: March 2000 to September 2001

Mount Usu (有珠山, Usu-zan) is an active stratovolcano in the Shikotsu-Tōya National Park, Hokkaido, Japan. It has erupted four times since 1900: in 1910 (which created Meiji-shinzan), 1944–45 (which created Shōwa-shinzan), August 7, 1977, and on March 31, 2000. To the north lies Lake Tōya. Mount Usu formed on the southern rim of the caldera containing the lake.

Mount Usu and Shōwa-shinzan are major tourist attractions in the Shikotsu-Tōya National Park. A rope-way on Mount Usu takes visitors to viewing platforms overlooking Shōwa-shinzan. The 1977 eruption is mentioned in passing in Alan Booth's travelogue, The Roads to Sata. The 2008 G8 Summit was held near Mount Usu at Lake Tōya.

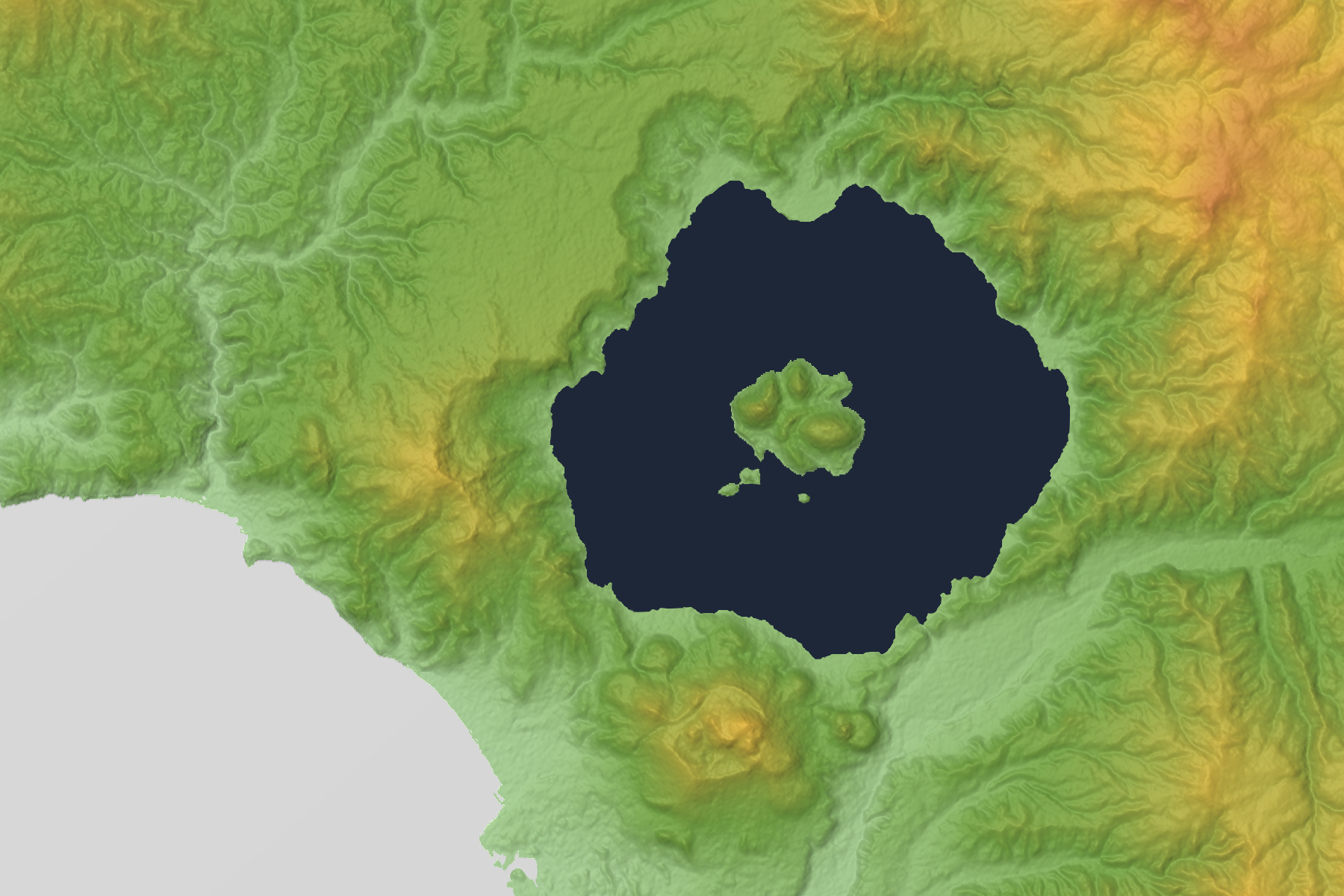
Tōya caldera &
Mount Usu (bottom)

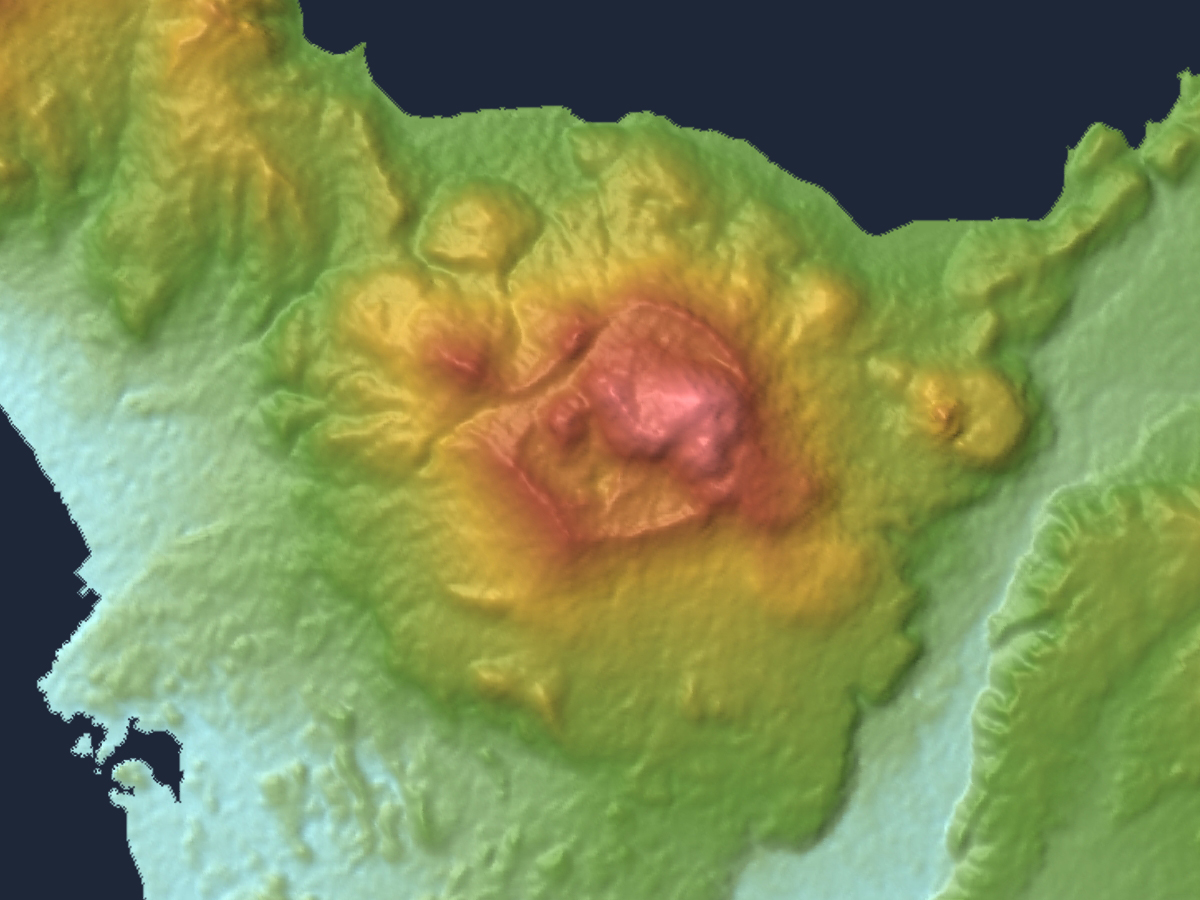
Mount Usu

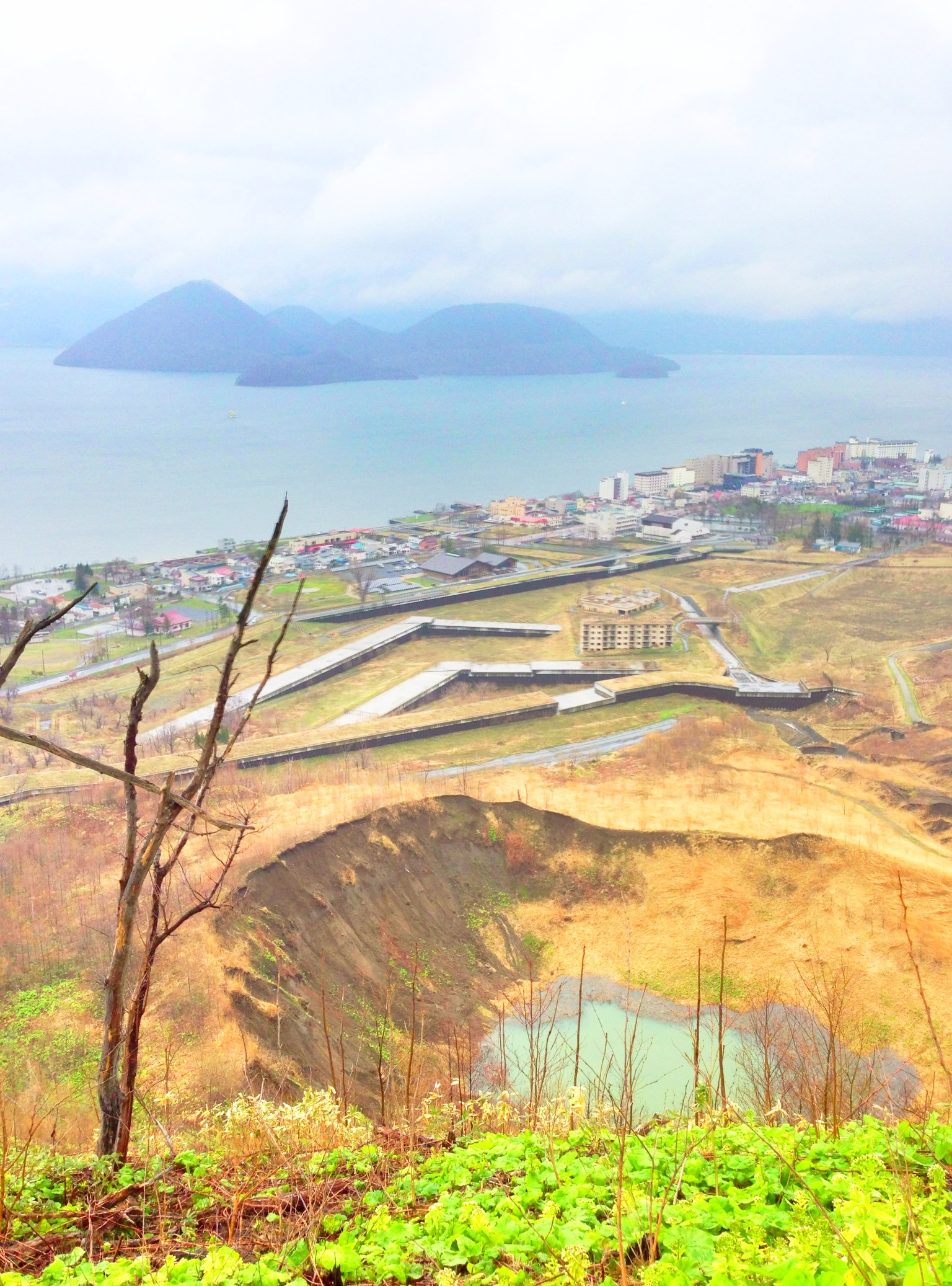
Tōya caldera & Usu volcano

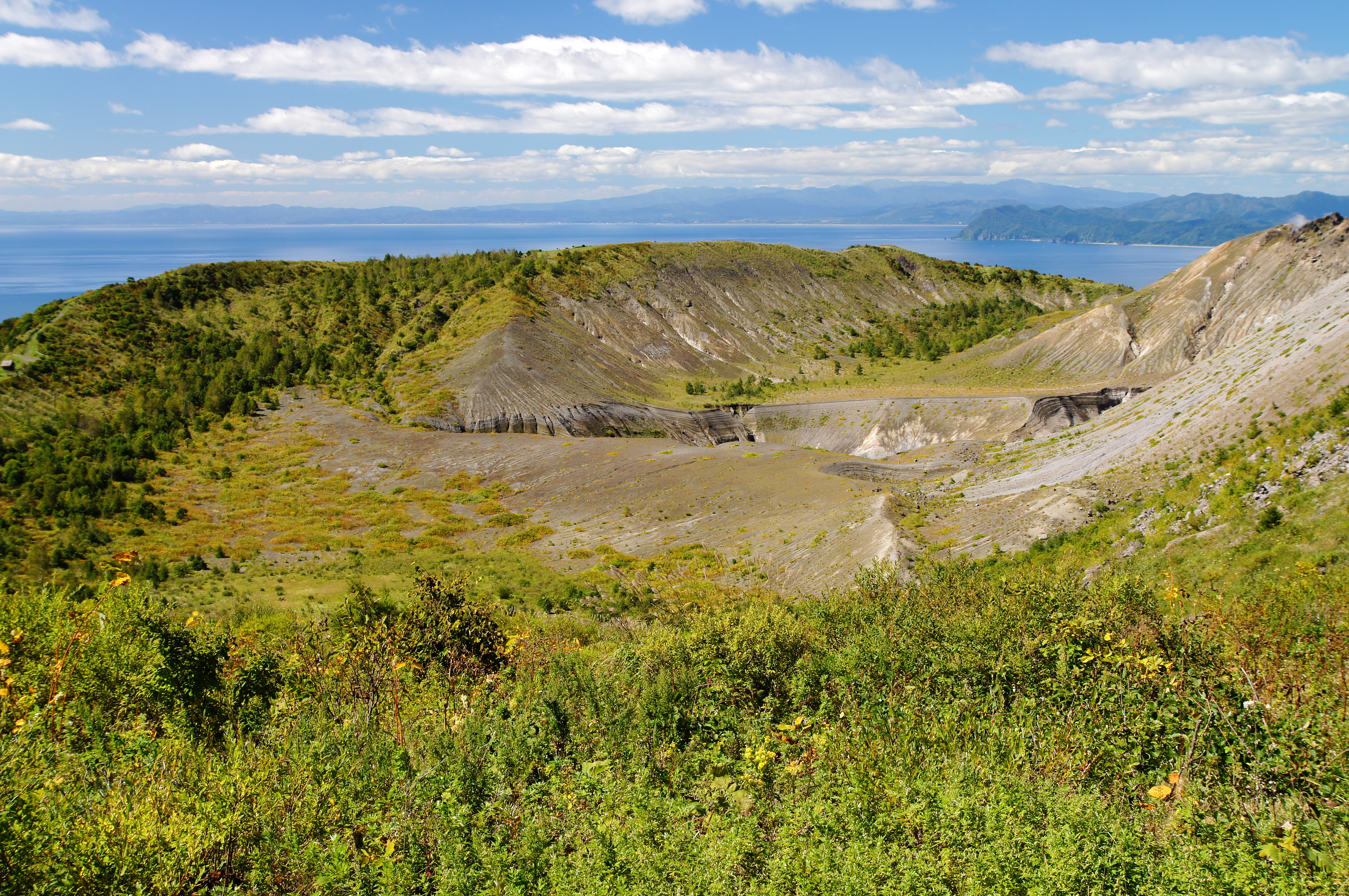
Mountaintop Crater

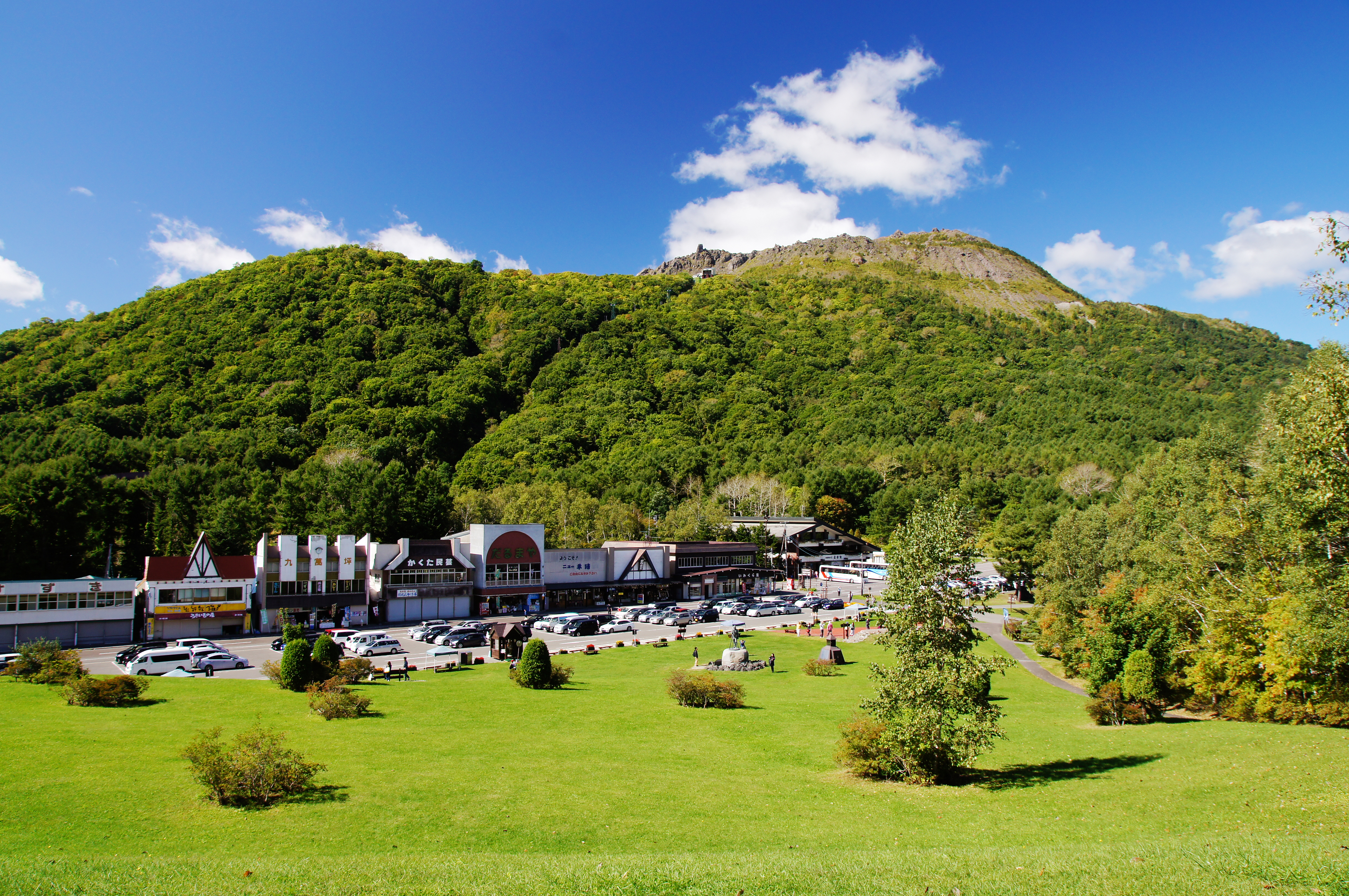
East side

== See also ==
- List of volcanoes in Japan
