= Shōwa-shinzan =

Volcanic lava dome in Hokkaido

- 昭和新山
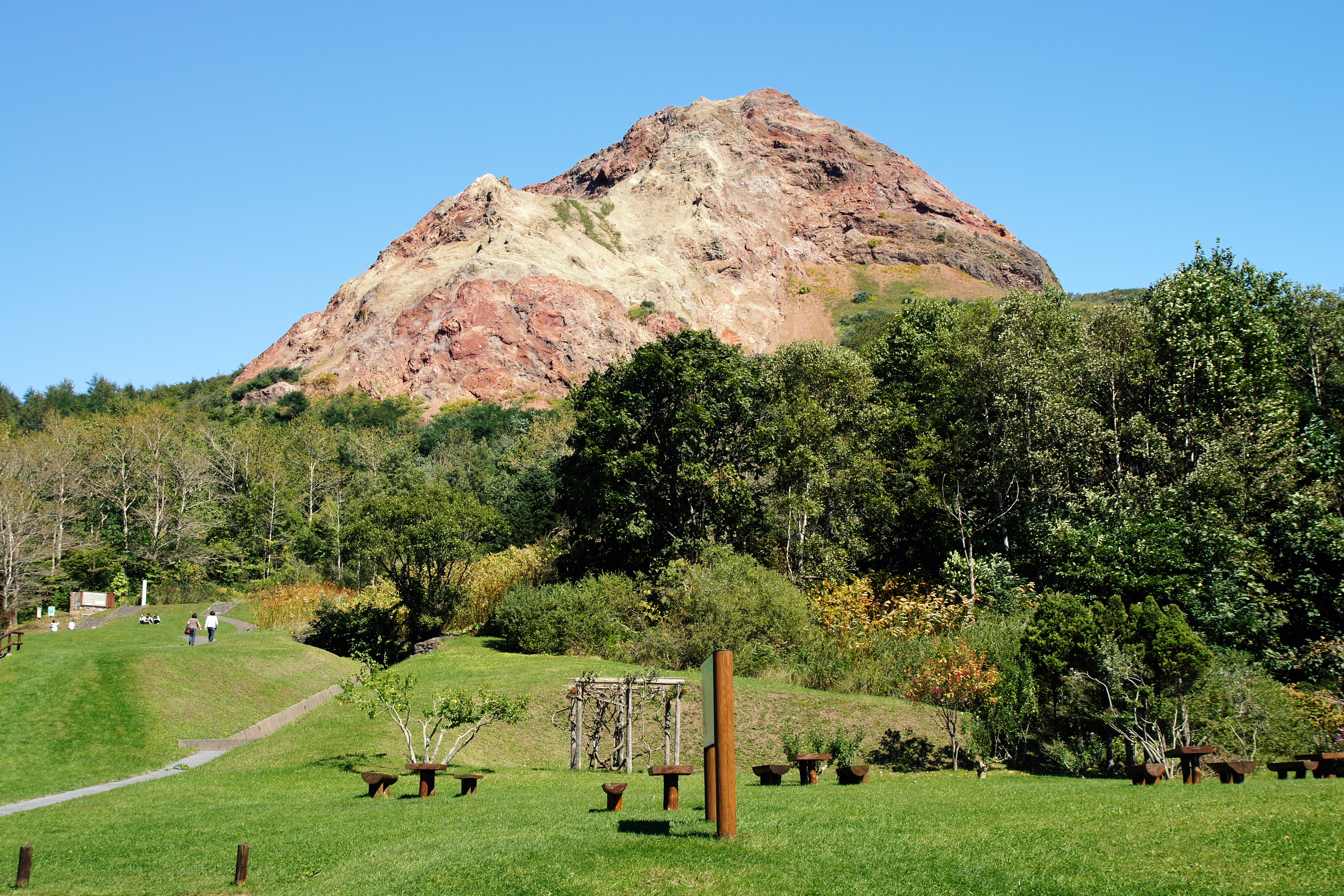
- Shōwa-shinzan (September 2013)

Highest point
- Elevation: 398 m (1,306 ft)
- Prominence: 211 m (692 ft)
- Parent peak: Mount Usu
- Listing: List of mountains and hills of Japan by height List of volcanoes in Japan
- Coordinates: 42°32′33″N 140°51′52″E

Naming
- English translation: New Mountain of the Shōwa Era
- Language of name: Japanese

Geography
- Location within Hokkaido
- Location: Hokkaidō, Japan
- Parent range: Nasu Volcanic Zone
- Topo map(s): Geographical Survey Institute 25000:1 壮瞥, 25000:1 虻田, 50000:1 虻田

Geology
- Mountain type: Lava dome
- Volcanic arc: Northeast Japan Arc
- Last eruption: 1945 (presently still steaming and emitting smoke and steam)

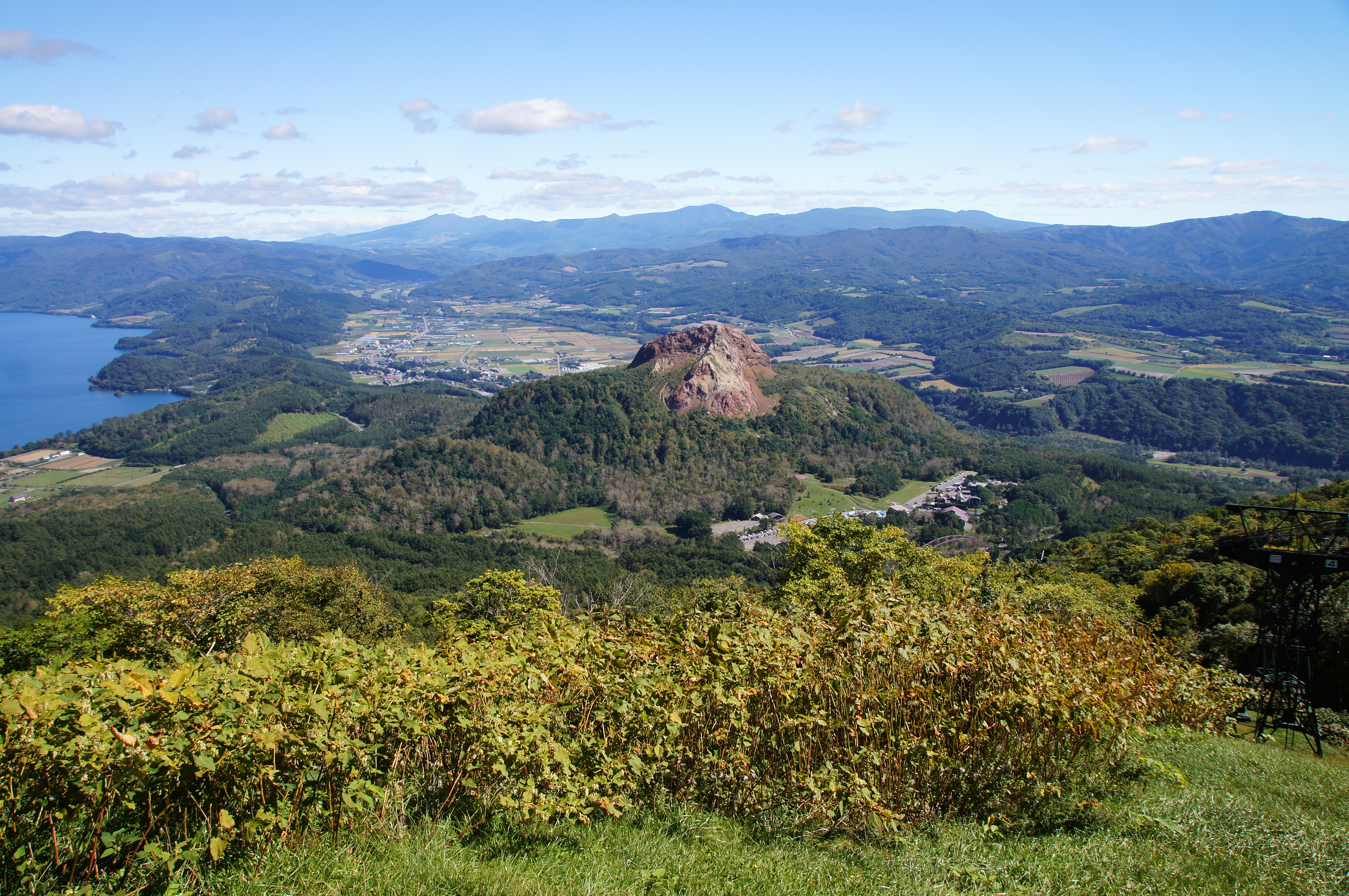
Viewed from Mount Usu

Shōwa-shinzan (昭和新山, Shōwa-shinzan) is a volcanic lava dome in the Shikotsu-Toya National Park, Hokkaido, Japan, next to Mount Usu. The mountain was created between 28 December 1943 and September 1945. Initially, a series of strong earthquakes shook the area, and wheat fields were rapidly uplifted. Lava broke through the surface and the current peak was created. The peak is now 398 m (1,306 ft) tall, and still actively smoking.

The name Shōwa-shinzan means "Shōwa new mountain", as it formed during the reign of Emperor Hirohito, known as the Shōwa period. When Shōwa-shinzan first appeared, the Japanese authorities were worried that it might be interpreted as an unlucky wartime omen, and its existence was kept secret. Much of the information about the peak's formation during these years comes from local postmaster Masao Mimatsu, who kept detailed measurements of its progress.

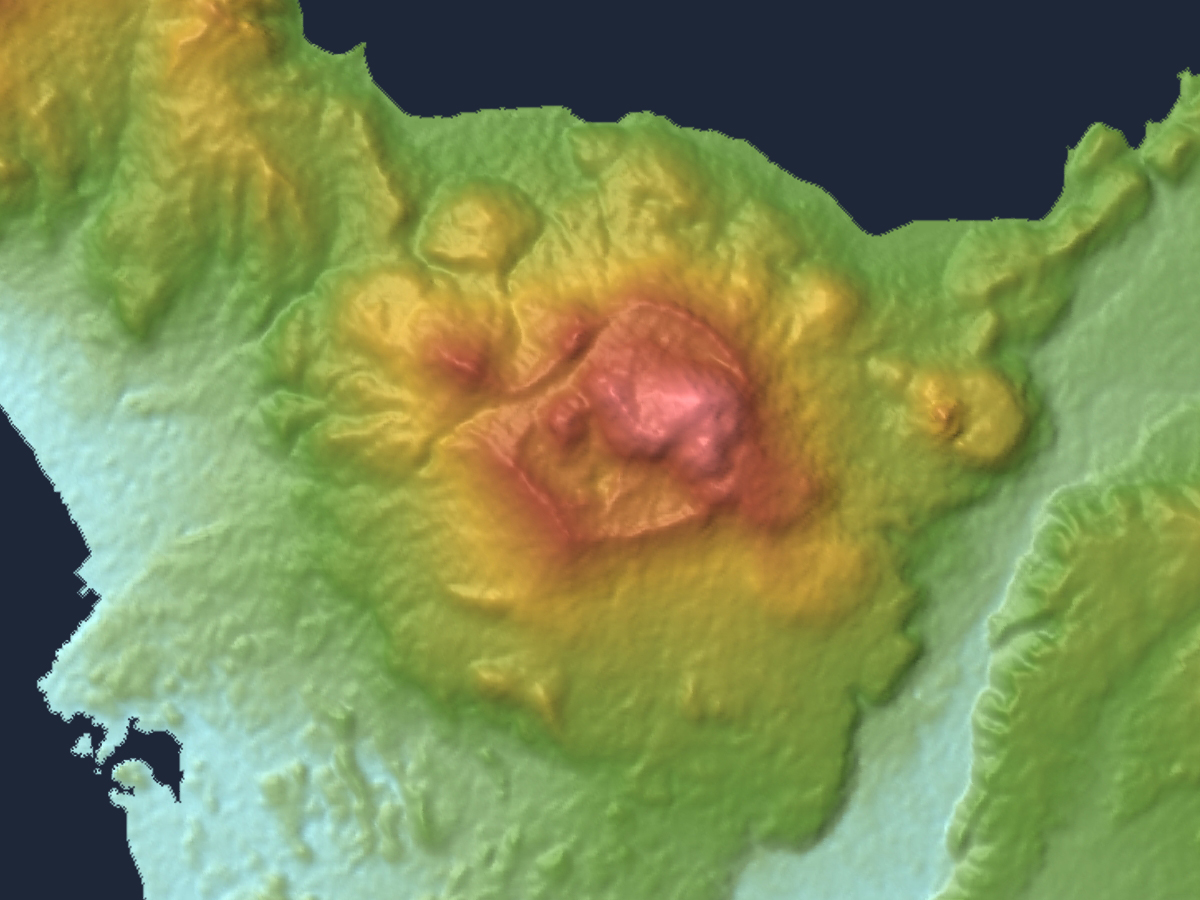
Location

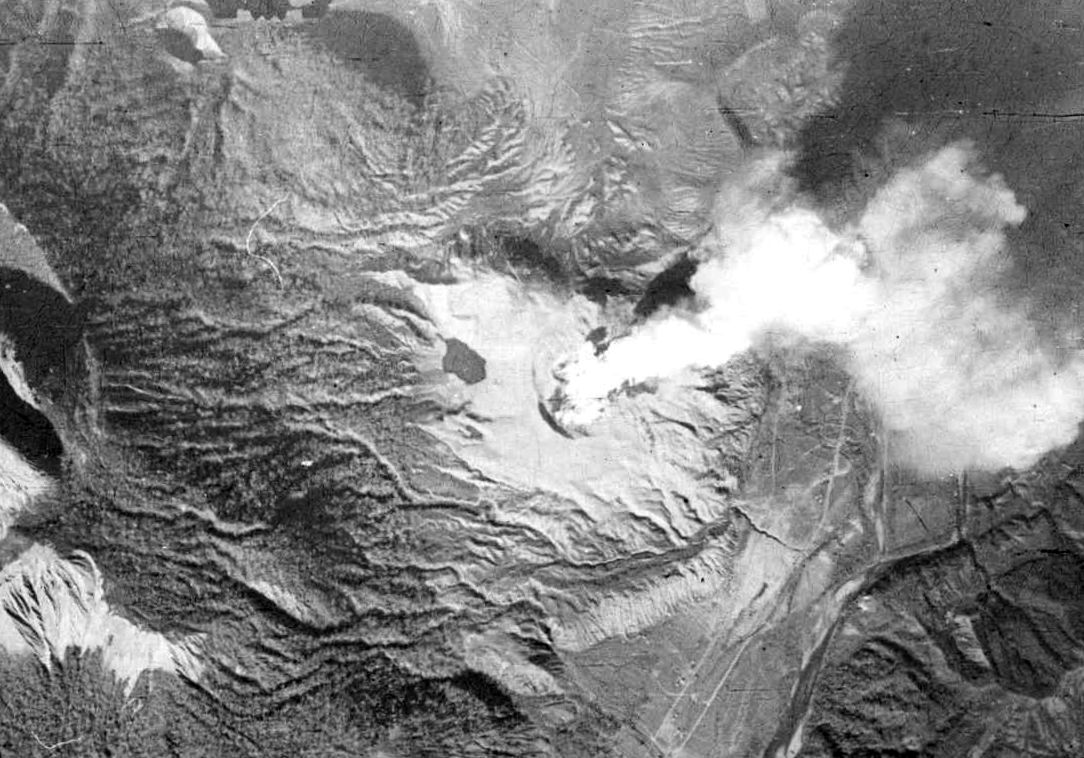
Shōwa-shinzan during its formative year in October 1944

== Volcanic activity timeline ==
Generally, the volcanic activity of Shōwa-shinzan can be divided into three main phases as recorded by Masao Mimatsu.

=== Phase 1, Pre-Eruption Phase (28 December 1943 – 22 June 1944) ===
On 28 December 1943, earthquakes started to occur frequently around Mount Usu, with more than 200 earthquakes per day on some days. The hypocenter in the early days was located in the vicinity of Lake Tōya. At the beginning of 1944, the hypocenter started to move toward the eastern part of the base of Mount Usu and this resulted in a protuberance emerging from the overlying ground. Eventually the protuberance started to spread to the north, reaching up to heights of 50 meters (54 yards) in some areas. The Sōbetsu riverbed also started to rise, and many fissures started to appear in the surrounding farmland. The longest fissure recorded was about 600 meters (656 yards) long. On 22 June 1944, there were about 250 earthquakes in one day, and accordingly the protuberance rose by 150 centimeters in one day.

=== Phase 2, Eruption Phase (23 June 1944 – 31 October 1944) ===
On 23 June 1944 at 0815 hours, smoke started to come out of the fissures and shortly after a huge eruption followed accompanied by a thunderous roar. On 2 July 1944, the eruption became even more vigorous, and a phreatomagmatic eruption occurred. On 7 July 1944, a pyroclastic surge accompanied the eruption. The surge managed to reach the northern bank of Lake Tōya, burning forests and houses in the process. By the end of October 1944, Masao Mimatsu recorded a total of seven craters, seventeen major eruptions and countless minor ones. Furthermore, centimeters of volcanic ash from the eruption had been found deposited up to one kilometer (0.6 mile) away from the volcano, while the protuberance of the ground continued to grow. From July 1944 to August 1944, the protuberance grew by two meters on some days.

=== Phase 3, Post Eruption Phase (1 November 1944 – September 1945) ===
During this phase all eruption activity stopped completely and a lava dome began to take shape. The lava dome continued to take shape until September 1945, when earthquake activity finally seemed to come to a halt. The birth of Shōwa-shinzan was finally complete. Even so, the volcano continues to emit smoke to this day.

== See also ==
- List of Special Places of Scenic Beauty, Special Historic Sites and Special Natural Monuments
- Parícutin, a volcano in Mexico which formed earlier in 1943
