= 北斗 =

北斗 is an East Asian name meaning "Northern dipper" or "Big Dipper".

北斗 may refer to:

- Beidou (disambiguation), the Chinese transliteration
- Hokuto (disambiguation), the Japanese transliteration
