= KiHa 283 series =

Japanese train type

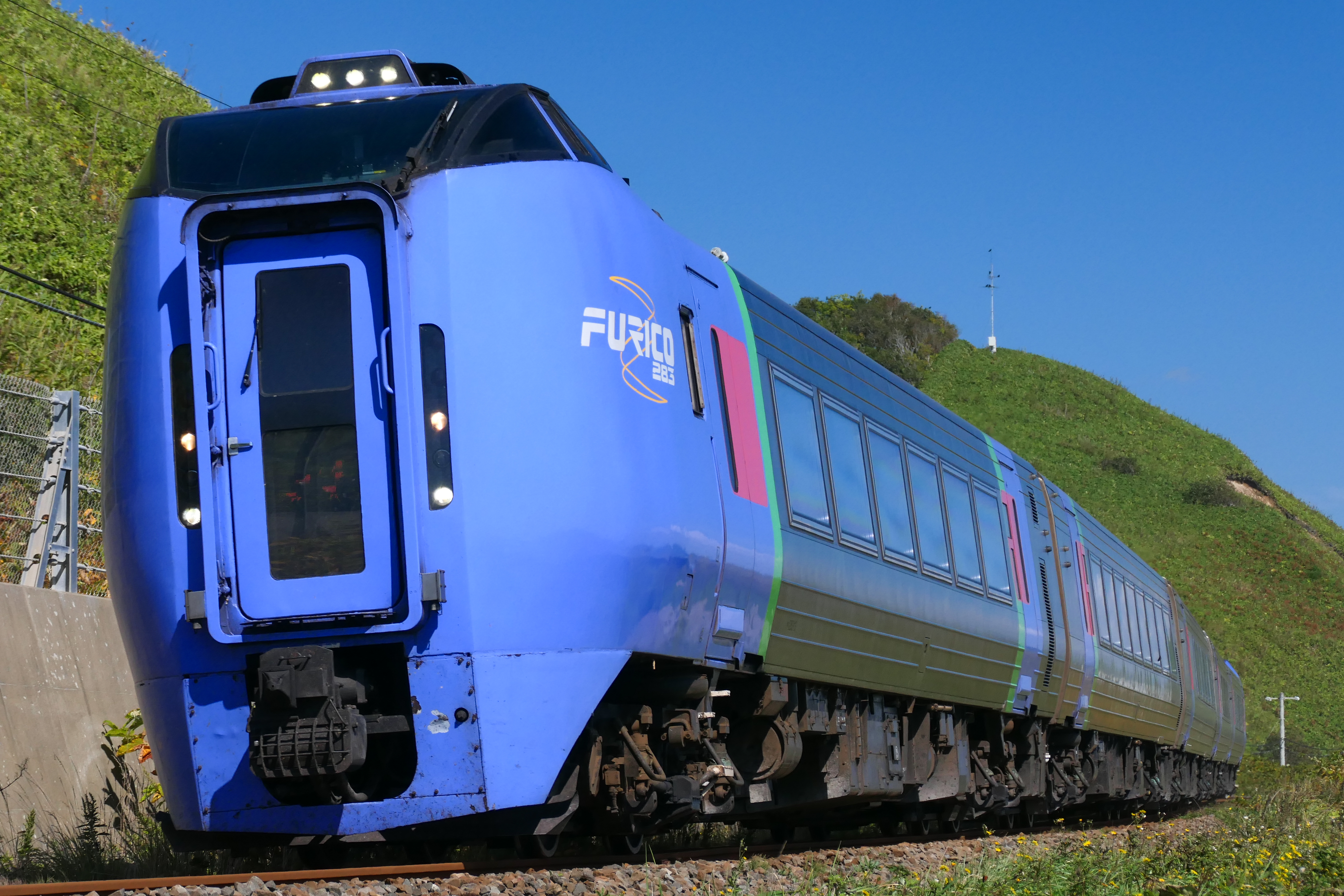
- KiHa 283 series on an Ōzora service, September 2021
- In service: 1997–present
- Manufacturer: Fuji Heavy Industries
- Replaced: KiHa 183 series (Okhotsk, Taisetsu)
- Constructed: 1995–2001
- Number built: 63 vehicles
- Number in service: 54 vehicles
- Number scrapped: 6 vehicles (fire damage); 3 vehicles (Pre-series set)
- Successor: KiHa 261 series (Ōzora)
- Formation: Various
- Operator: JR Hokkaido
- Depot: Sapporo
- Lines served: Hakodate Main Line; Nemuro Main Line; Sekihoku Main Line; Sekishō Line

Specifications
- Car body construction: Stainless steel
- Car length: 21,300 mm (69 ft 11 in)
- Width: 2,840 mm (9 ft 4 in)
- Height: 4,050 mm (13 ft 3 in)
- Doors: 1 per side
- Maximum speed: 130 km/h (81 mph) (- October 2013); 110 km/h (68 mph) (November 2013 -)
- Prime mover: N-DMF11HZA (355 hp or 265 kW) × 2 per car
- Transmission: Hydraulic
- Track gauge: 1,067 mm (3 ft 6 in)

The KiHa 283 series (キハ283系) is a tilting diesel-hydraulic multiple unit (DMU) train type operated by Hokkaido Railway Company (JR Hokkaido) on limited express services in Hokkaido, Japan, since 1997. They were based on the KiHa 281 series trains introduced in 1994.

The "KiHa" designation derives from the classification system used by JNR. "Ki" indicates a diesel-powered vehicle, while "Ha" indicates an ordinary passenger car, as opposed to a green car.

== Operations ==
KiHa 283 series trainsets have been used on the following services.

- Ōzora services between Sapporo and Kushiro, from 22 March 1997 until March 2022
- Hokuto services between Hakodate and Sapporo, since April 1998, until 31 October 2013
- Tokachi services between Sapporo and Obihiro, since 11 March 2000, until 31 October 2013
- Okhotsk services, since 18 March 2023
- Taisetsu services, from 18 March 2023 until 14 March 2025

== History ==
A three-car pre-production set was delivered from Fuji Heavy Industries in 1995 for evaluation and testing.

20 production vehicles were delivered from 1996, with the first trains introduced on Super Ōzora services between Sapporo and Kushiro from the start of the revised timetable on 22 March 1997.

A further batch of 12 vehicles was delivered to coincide with the introduction of KiHa 283s on Super Hokuto services between Hakodate and Sapporo, operating alongside the KiHa 281 series sets.

KiHa 283 series sets were also introduced on some Super Tokachi services between Sapporo and Obihiro from 11 March 2000.

From the start of the revised timetable on 12 March 2022, all Ōzora limited express services are scheduled to be operated by KiHa 261 series DMUs; the KiHa 283 series DMUs were withdrawn from Ōzora limited express services on 11 March 2022. The KiHa 283 series was reallocated for use on Okhotsk and Taisetsu limited express services on the Sekihoku Main Line from 18 March 2023, operating as three-car sets and replacing the older KiHa 183 series DMUs used on these services.

== 2011 Sekishō Line derailment and fire ==
On 27 May 2011, a 6-car KiHa 283 series train was destroyed by fire after it derailed and made an emergency stop inside the 685-metre-long (2,247 ft) No. 1 Niniu Tunnel on the Sekishō Line in Shimukappu, at around 21:55, while forming the Super Ōzora 14 service from Kushiro to Sapporo. The train was formed as follows, with car 1 at the Kushiro end. All cars were gutted by fire, and were officially withdrawn on 30 June 2011.

Car No.	1	2	3	4	5	6
Number	KiHa 283-1	KiHa 282-3001	KiRo 282-7	KiHa 282-1	KiHa 282-101	KiHa 283-9
