= Beidu =

Beidu (Chinese: 北都; lit. 'northern capital') may refer to:

- Taiyuan, a city in China, formerly known as Beidu during the Tang Dynasty
- Beidu, Henan, a town in Zhanhe, Pingdingshan
- Beidu, a village in Shangmei, Hunan
- Beidu, a village in Nanyin, Hebei
- Ye (Hebei), one of the five capitals of the Wei state
- Shengle, the first capital of the Northern Wei
- Bing Prefecture, renamed Beidu by Wu Zetian
- Northern Metropolis, a planning area and proposed development scheme in Hong Kong

== See also ==
- Beijing (disambiguation), another term meaning "northern capital"
- Hokuto (disambiguation) (Japanese: 北都), the Japanese reading of the same characters
- Baidu, a Chinese web company
- Beidou (disambiguation)
