= KiHa 261 series =

Japanese train type

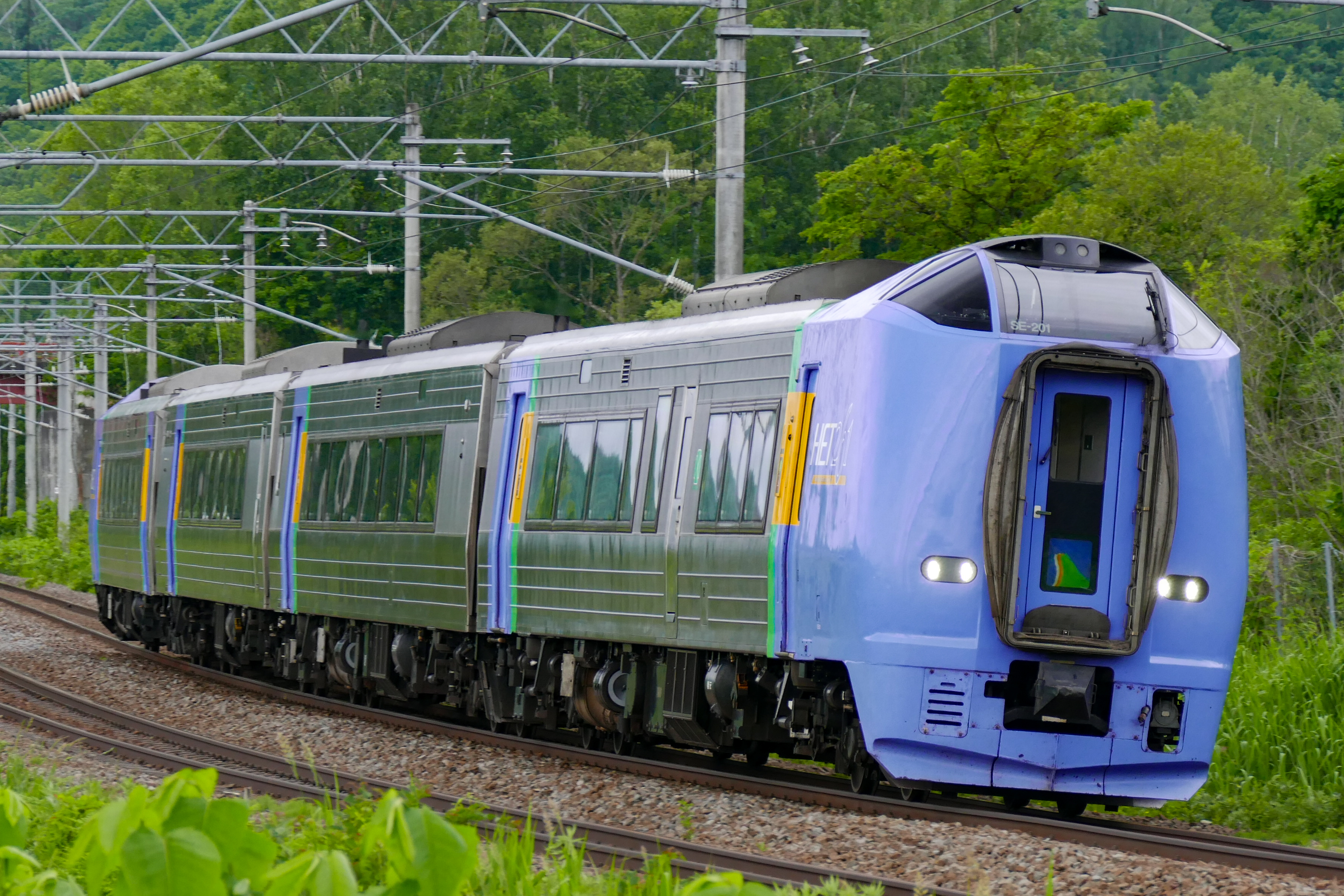
- KiHa 261 series on a Sōya service in June 2022
- In service: 2000–Present
- Manufacturers: Fuji Heavy Industries; JR Hokkaido; Kawasaki Heavy Industries
- Replaced: KiHa 183 series, KiHa 281 series, KiHa 283 series
- Constructed: 1998–
- Number under construction: 28 vehicles (as of December 2013)
- Number built: 35 vehicles (as of April 2013)
- Number in service: 35 vehicles (as of April 2013)
- Formation: 4–6 cars per trainset
- Operator: JR Hokkaido
- Depot: Naebo

Specifications
- Car body construction: Stainless steel
- Car length: 21,300 mm (69 ft 11 in) (intermediate); 21,470 mm (70 ft 5 in) (261-0 end); 21,670 mm (71 ft 1 in) (261-1000 end)
- Width: 2,800 mm (9 ft 2 in) (261-0); 2,928 mm (9 ft 7.3 in) (261-1000)
- Height: 4,012 mm (13 ft 2.0 in) (261-0); 3,982 mm (13 ft 0.8 in) (261-1000)
- Doors: 1 per side
- Maximum speed: 130 km/h (81 mph)
- Prime mover: N-DMF13HZH (× 1 or × 2 per car)
- Power output: 460 hp (340 kW) per engine
- Transmission: Hydraulic
- Track gauge: 1,067 mm (3 ft 6 in)

The KiHa 261 series (キハ261系) is a tilting diesel multiple unit (DMU) train type operated by Hokkaido Railway Company (JR Hokkaido) on limited express services in Hokkaido, Japan, since 2000.

The "KiHa" designation derives from the classification system used by JNR. "Ki" indicates a diesel-powered vehicle, while "Ha" indicates an ordinary passenger car, as opposed to a green car.

== Design ==
The running gear was based on the KiHa 201 series trains introduced in 1997, and the body design was a joint venture with the Danish State Railways (DSB).

== Fleet ==
As of 1 April 2013, 35 KiHa 261 series vehicles were in operation. 14 were built by Fuji Heavy Industries, and 21 were built by JR Hokkaido. A further 28 vehicles are on order to be delivered from fiscal 2015.

== Operations ==
KiHa 261 series trainsets are used on the following services.

=== KiHa 261-0 series ===
- Sōya services between Sapporo and Wakkanai, since 11 March 2000
- Sarobetsu services between Asahikawa and Wakkanai, since 4 March 2017

=== KiHa 261-1000 series ===
- Tokachi services between Sapporo and Obihiro, since 1 October 2007
- Hokuto services between Sapporo and Hakodate, since 26 March 2016
- Ōzora services between Sapporo and Kushiro, since 14 March 2020
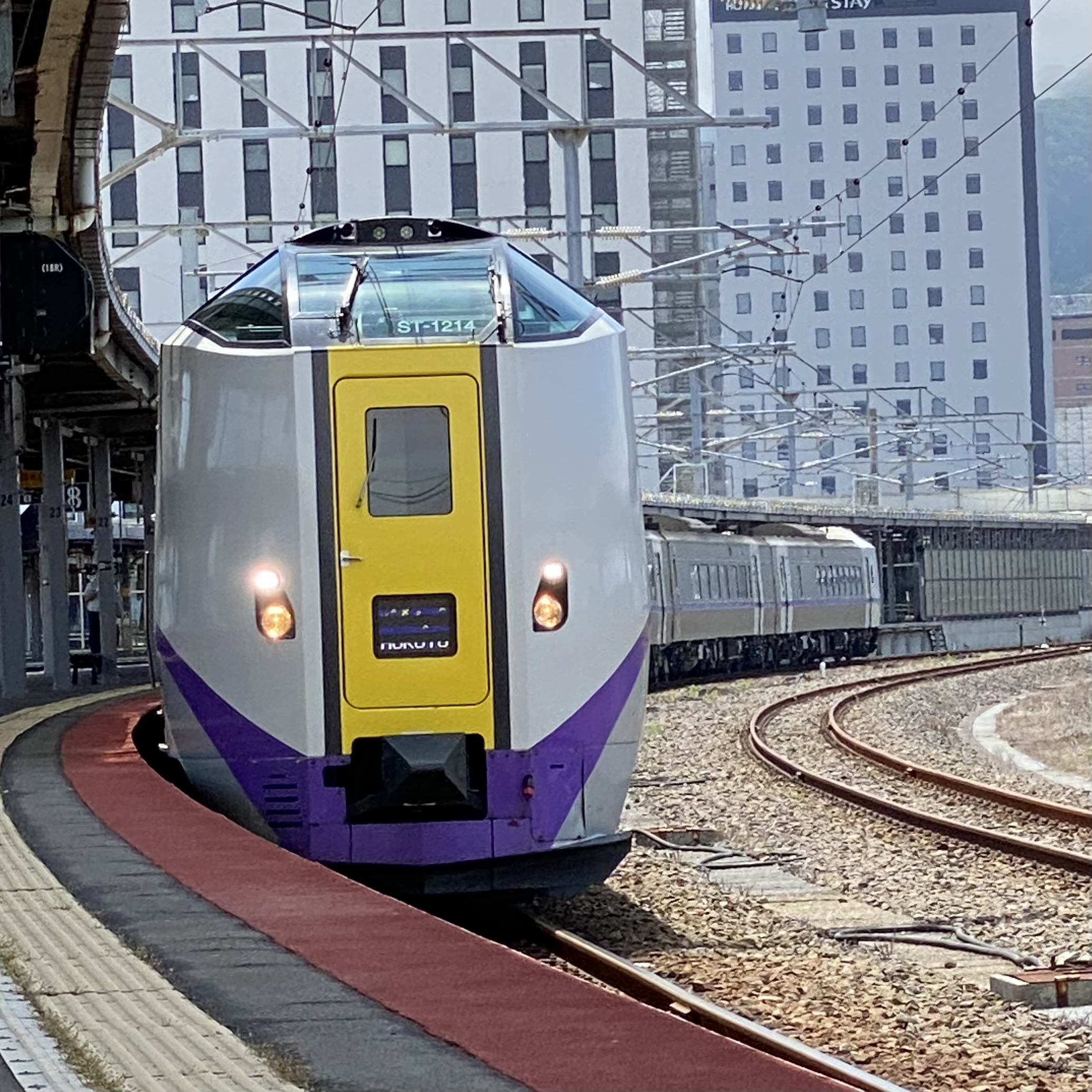
- Limited Express Hokuto at Hakodate Station

== Formations ==
=== Sōya ===
Sōya services are normally formed of four-car KiHa 261-100 series sets, and are sometimes lengthened to six cars during busy periods.

==== 4-car formations ====
Four-car sets are formed as follows.

Car No.	1	2	3	4
Numbering	KiRoHa 261-200	KiHa 260-200	KiHa 260-100	KiHa 261-100

==== 6-car formations ====
Six-car sets are formed by adding two cars as shown below. Car 1 (and car 21) includes Green (first) class and standard class accommodation.

Car No.	1	2	3	4	5	6
Numbering	KiRoHa 261-200	KiHa 260-200	KiHa 260-100	KiHa 261-100	KiHa 260-100	KiHa 261-100

Car No.	21	22	1	2	3	4
Numbering	KiRoHa 261-200	KiHa 260-200	KiRoHa 261-200	KiHa 260-200	KiHa 260-100	KiHa 261-100

=== Super Tokachi ===
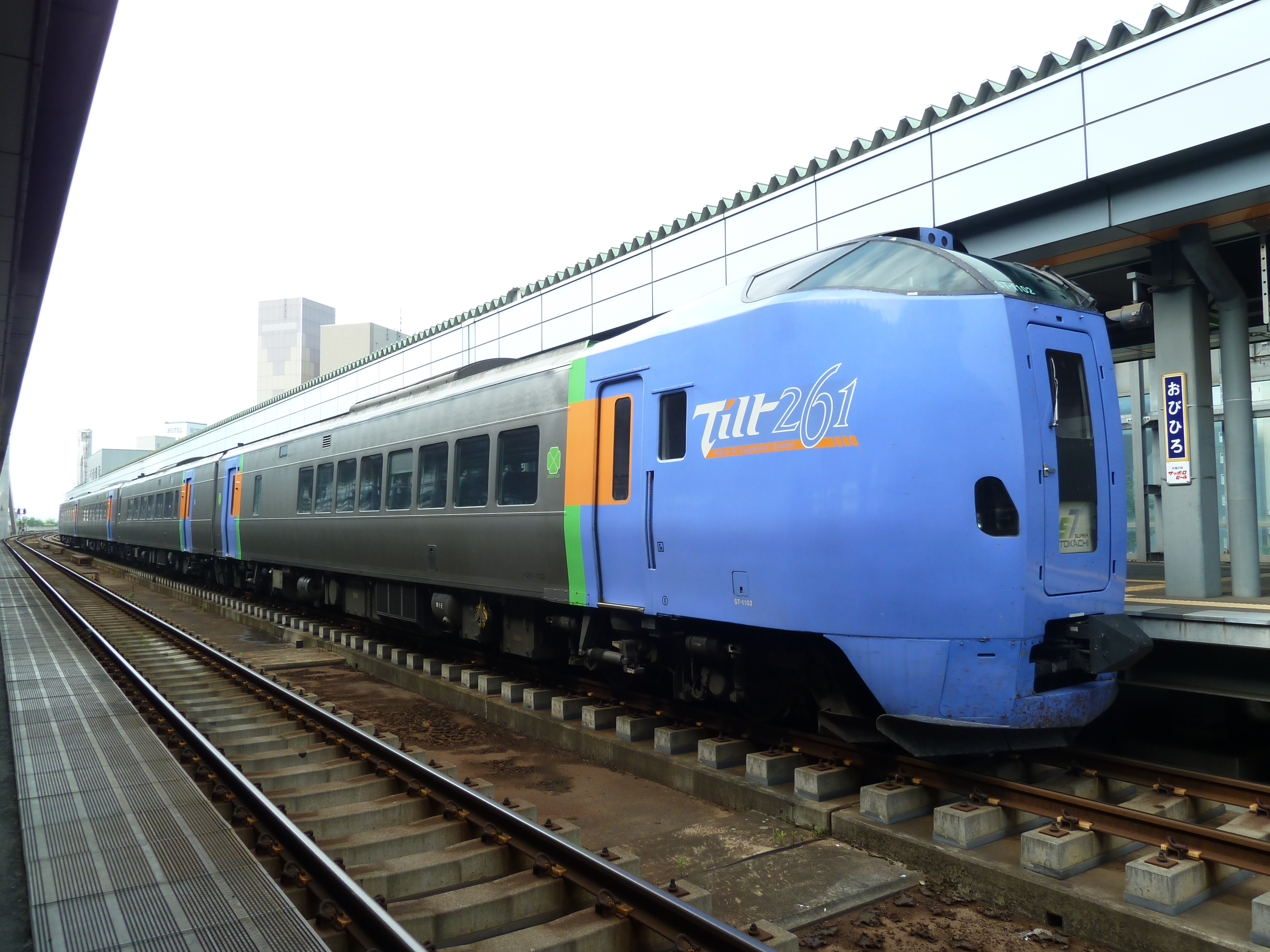
4-car KiHa 261-1000 series set on a Super Tokachi service in August 2012

Super Tokachi services were originally formed of five-car KiHa 261-1000 series sets, but these were later reduced to four cars.

The 4-car Super Tokachi sets are formed as follows.

Car No.	1	2	3	4
Numbering	KiRo 261-1100	KiHa 260-1100	KiHa 260-1200	KiHa 261-1200

== Interior ==
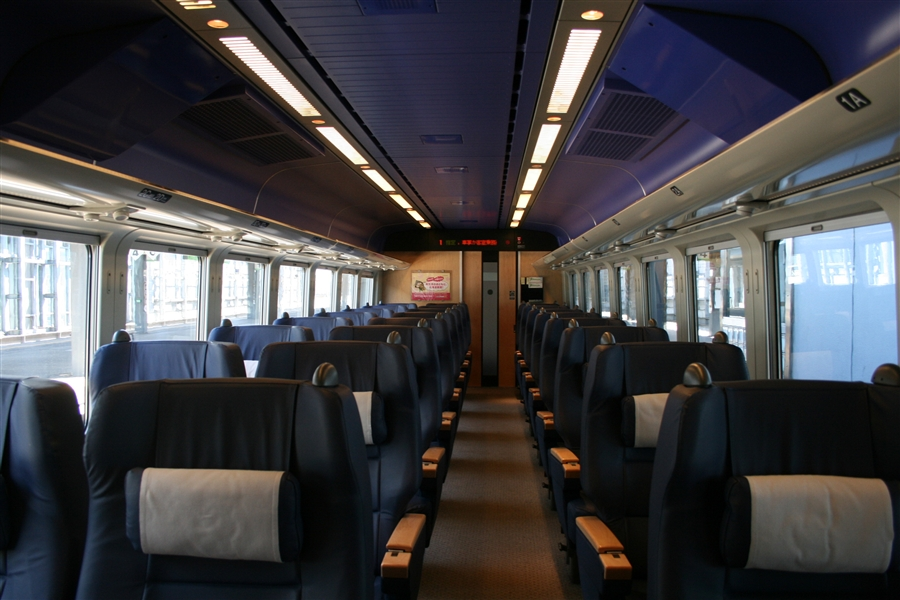
Interior of Green car KiRo 261-1102 in April 2009

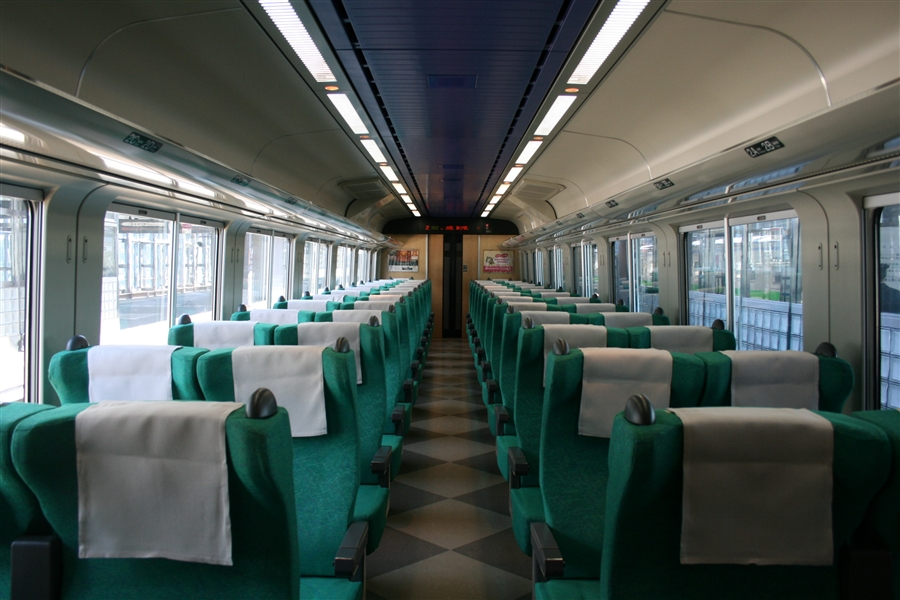
Interior of ordinary-class car KiHa 260-1102 in April 2009

== History ==
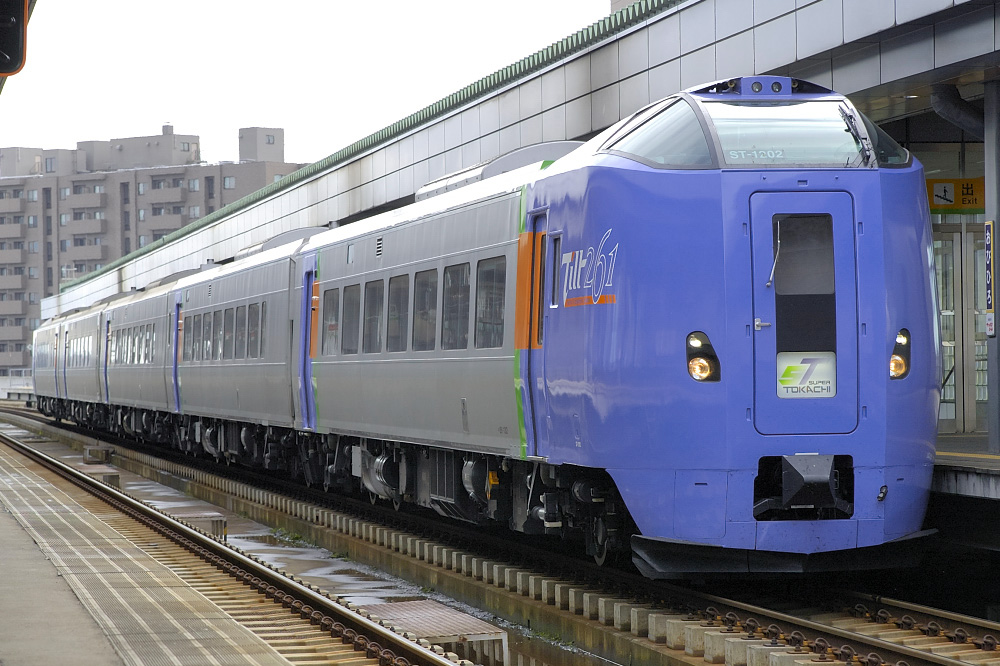
5-car KiHa 261-1000 series set as first introduced on Super Tokachi services, October 2007

A four-car pre-production set was delivered from Fuji Heavy Industries in November 1998 for evaluation and testing. The first production trains were introduced on Super Sōya services between Sapporo and Wakkanai from the start of the revised timetable on 11 March 2000.

New KiHa 261-1000 series 5-car sets were introduced on Super Tokachi services between Sapporo and Obihiro from October 2007.

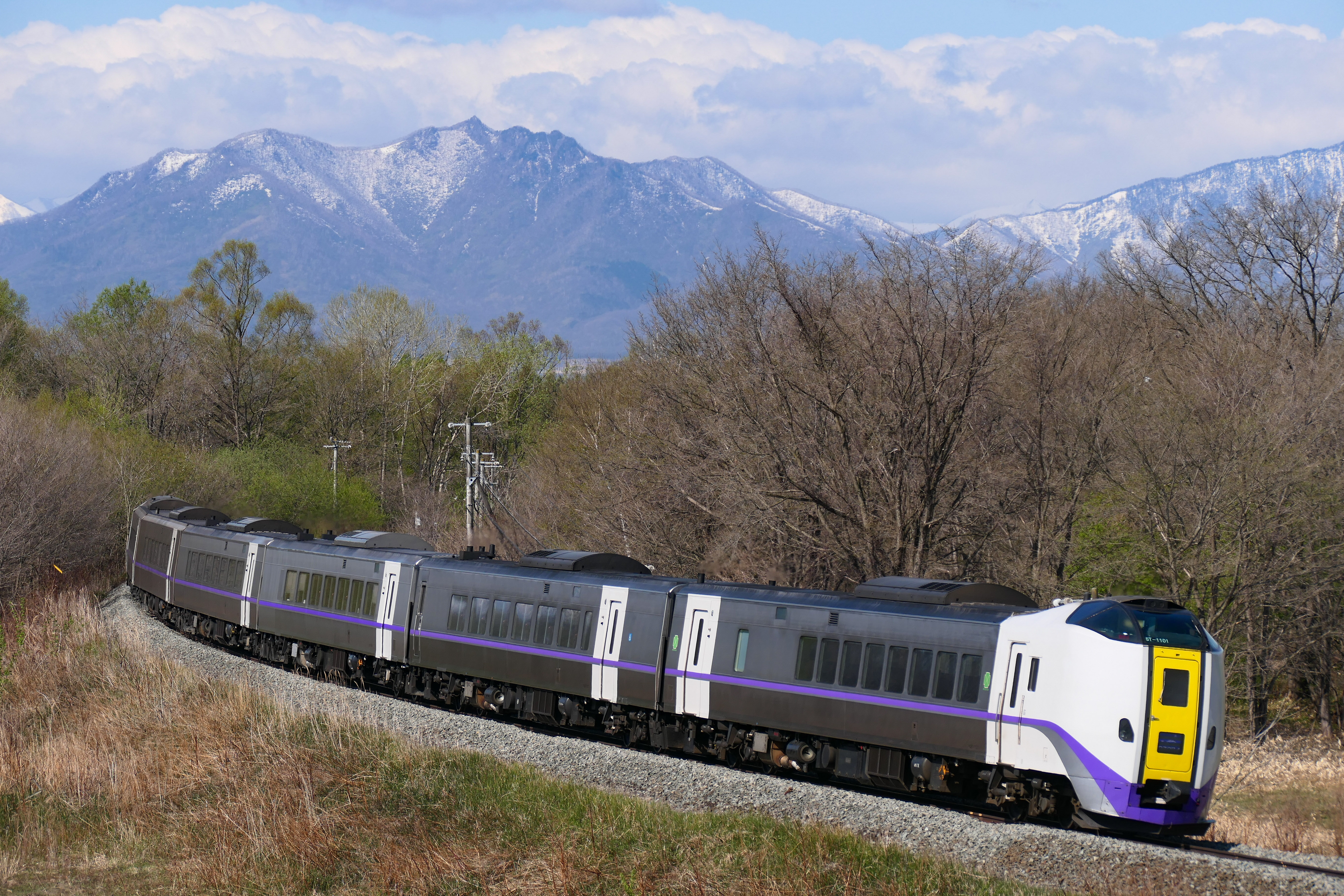
KiHa 261-1000 series set ST1101 in revised livery in May 2021

A further 28 KiHa 261 series vehicles were delivered from 2015 onward, and these are not equipped with tilting capability.

From December 2015 until the end of 2017, the KiHa 261-1000 series fleet were gradually repainted into a new livery with white front ends, yellow front-end gangway doors, and a purple bodyside stripe.

=== KiHa 261-5000 series ===
On 17 October 2019, JR Hokkaido announced plans to introduce two new KiHa 261-5000 series 5-car sets. They each feature external liveries inspired by the hamanasu and lavender flowers, which, according to JR Hokkaido, are prominent throughout Hokkaido.

Car 1 is designated as a lounge car, featuring window-facing seats and transverse seating bays with tables. Cars 2 through 5 are ordinary-class cars, featuring 2+2 abreast seating throughout.

The "Hamanasu" set was built at Kawasaki Heavy Industries' Hyogo factory, and was delivered to JR Hokkaido in July 2020. It entered revenue service on 17 October of that year. The "Lavender" set was delivered from the same factory in January 2021 and entered revenue service in May of that year, although it was originally intended to enter service in April.

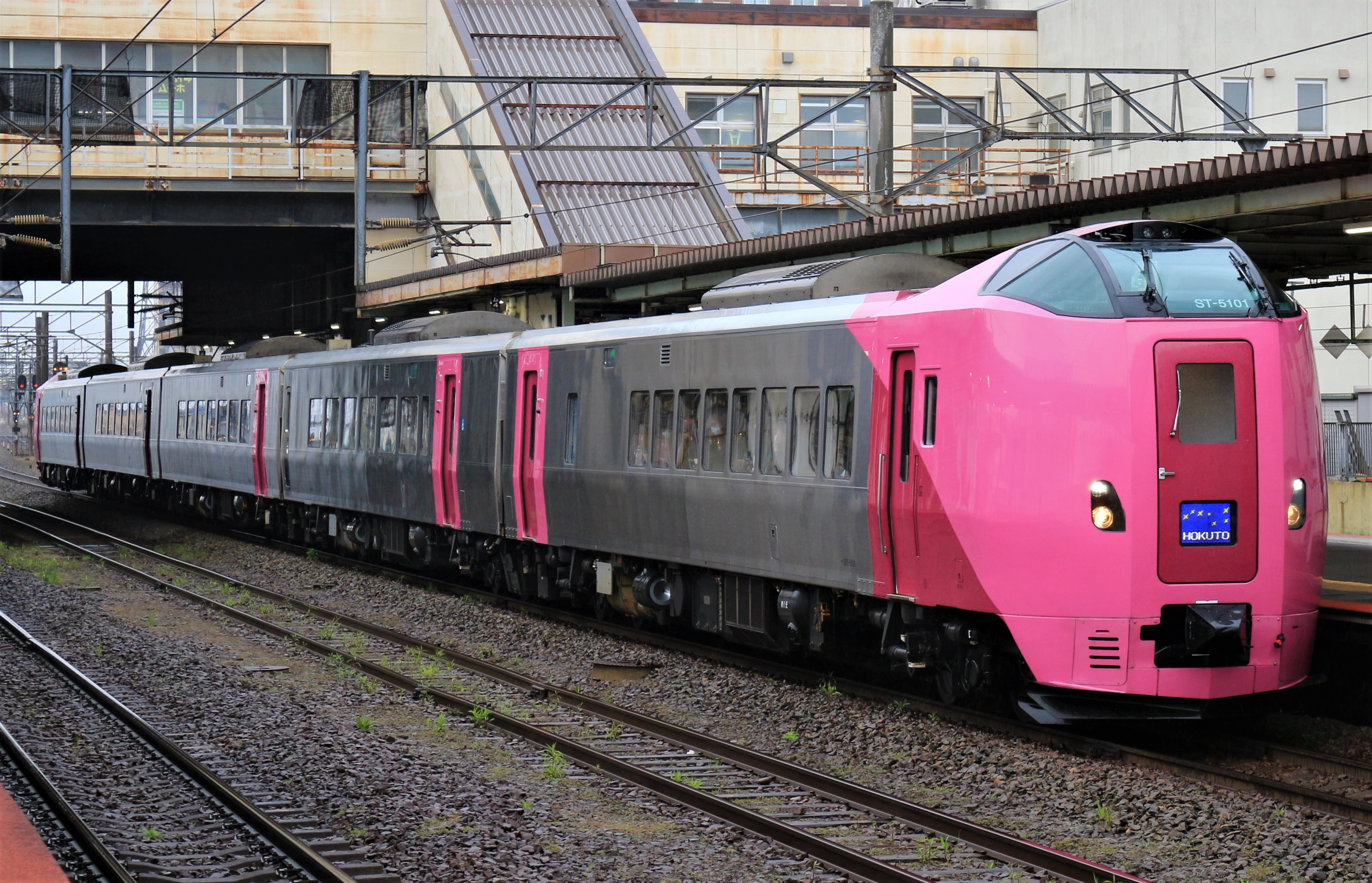
The KiHa 261-5000 series "Hamanasu" set in May 2022

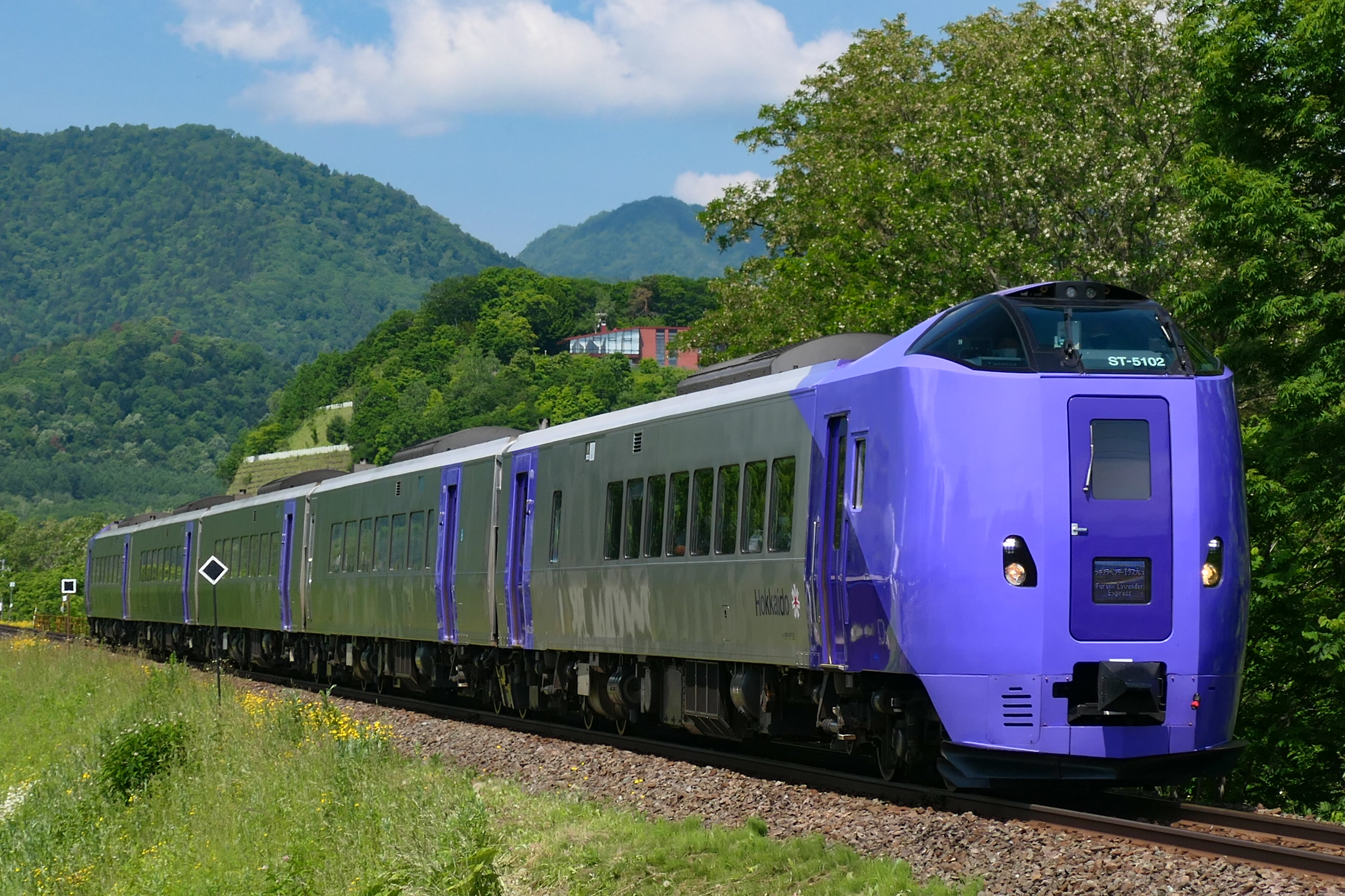
The KiHa 261-5000 series "Lavender" set in June 2022

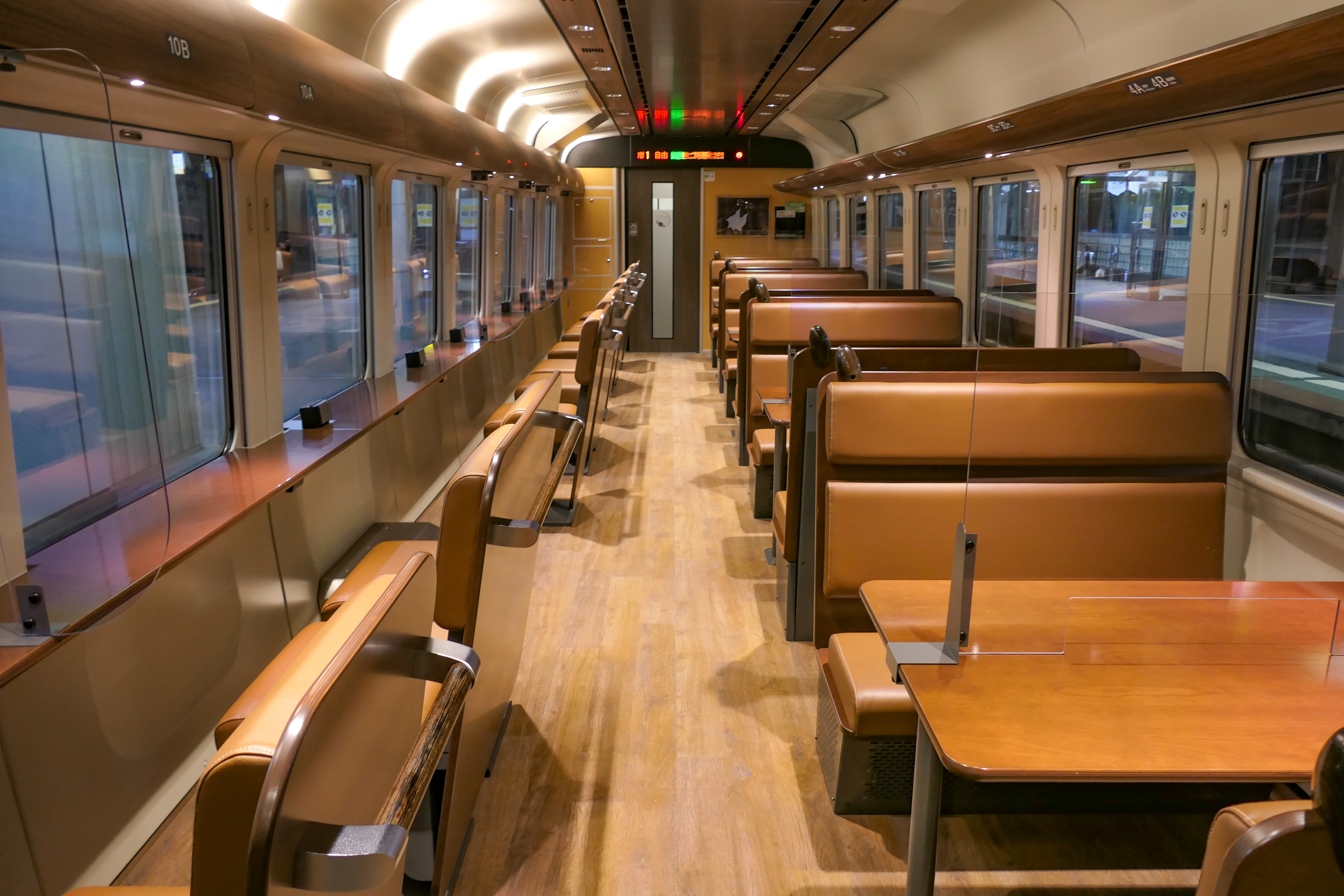
Lounge interior

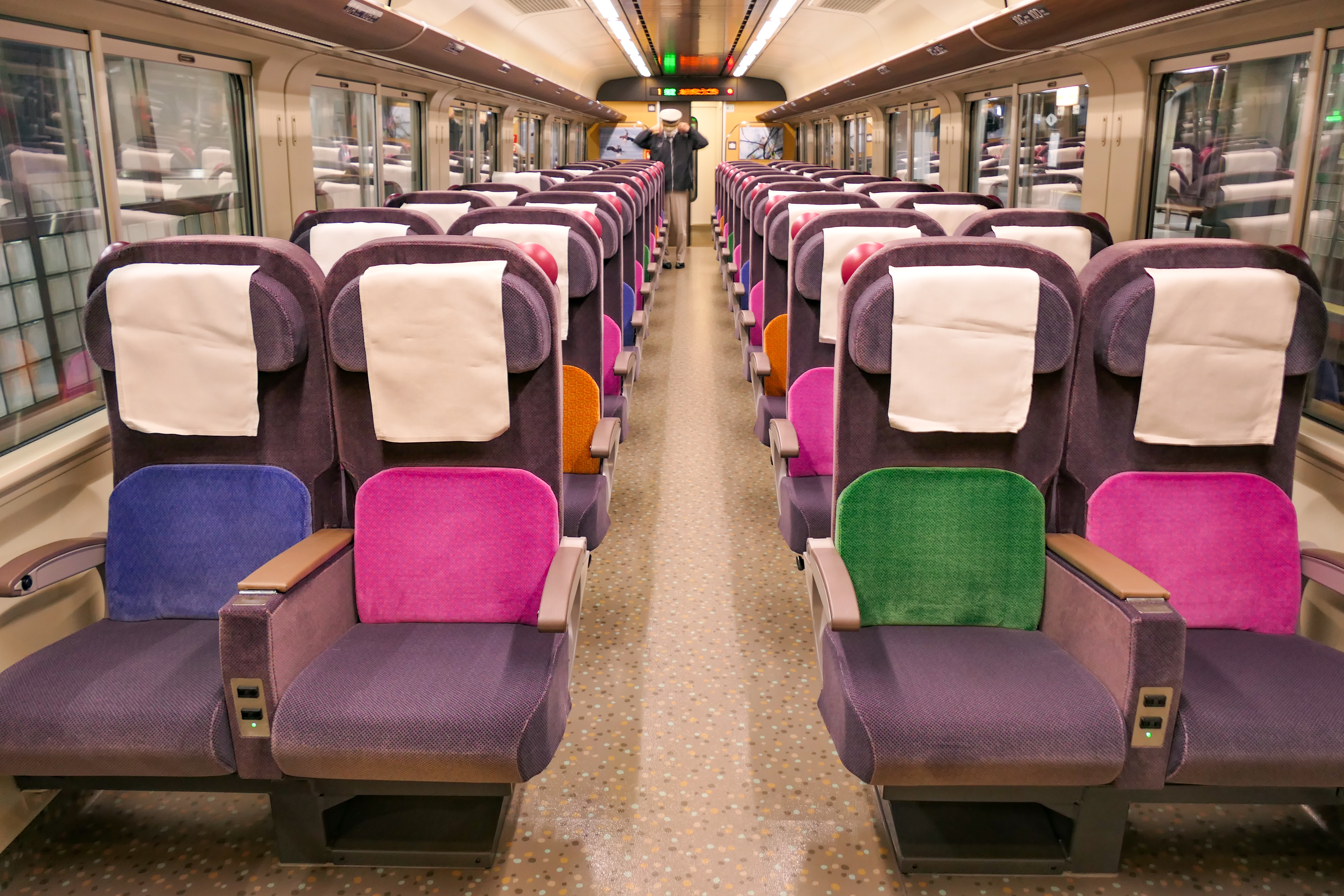
Ordinary-class interior
