= Tokachi (train) =

Japanese passenger train service

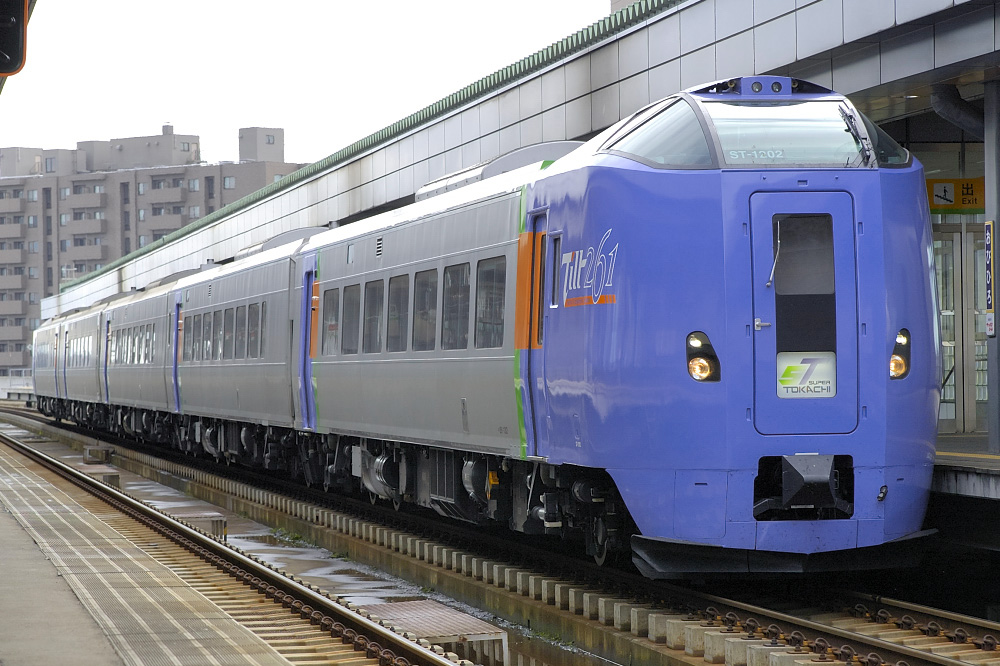
- KiHa 261-1000 series DMU on a Super Tokachi service at Obihiro Station, October 2007

Overview
- Service type: Limited express
- Status: Operational
- Locale: Hokkaido
- First service: 1 February 1962 (Express); 1 September 1990 (Limited express); 27 July 1991 (Super Tokachi)
- Current operator: JR Hokkaido
- Former operator: JNR

Route
- Termini: Sapporo; Obihiro
- Stops: 11
- Distance travelled: 220.2 km (136.8 mi)
- Average journey time: 2 hours 30 minutes approx
- Service frequency: 5 return services daily
- Lines used: Hakodate Main Line, Sekishō Line, Nemuro Main Line

On-board services
- Class: Standard + Green
- Disabled access: Yes
- Sleeping arrangements: None
- Catering facilities: None
- Observation facilities: None
- Entertainment facilities: None
- Other facilities: Toilets

Technical
- Rolling stock: KiHa 261 series, KiHa 283 series DMUs
- Track gauge: 1,067 mm (3 ft 6 in)
- Electrification: Diesel
- Operating speed: 120 km/h (75 mph)
- Track owner: JR Hokkaido

The Tokachi (とかち) is a limited express train service between Sapporo and Obihiro via the Hakodate, Sekishō and Nemuro Main Lines in Hokkaido, Japan, operated by Hokkaido Railway Company (JR Hokkaido). As of November 2013, there are five trains per day running in both directions, with the fastest journey taking 2 hours 25 minutes (Super Tokachi 4).

== Stops ==
Trains stop at the following stations:

Sapporo - Shin-Sapporo - Minami-Chitose - Oiwake - Shin-Yubari - Shimukappu - Tomamu - Shintoku - Tokachi-Shimizu - Memuro - Obihiro

== Rolling stock ==
Super Tokachi services are formed of 4-car (originally 5-car) KiHa 261 series and 5-car KiHa 283 series diesel multiple unit (DMU) trains.

=== Formations ===
All cars are no-smoking.

==== KiHa 261 series ====
Car No.	1	2	3	4
Accommodation	Green	Reserved	Reserved	Non-reserved

==== KiHa 283 series (Past) ====
Car No.	1	2	3	4	5
Accommodation	Green	Reserved	Reserved	Non-reserved	Non-reserved

=== Past ===
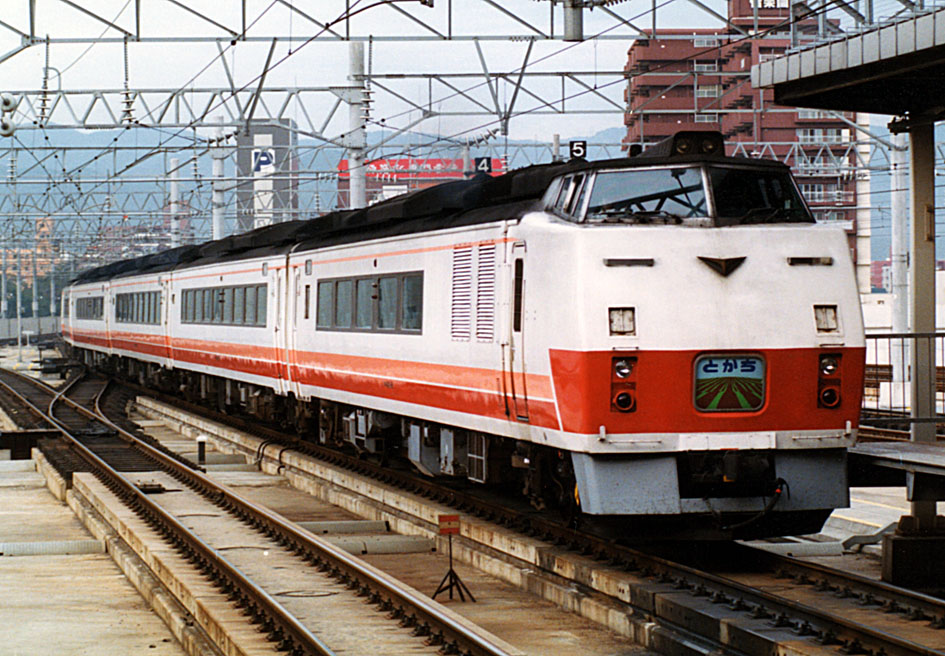
KiHa 183 series Tokachi service, September 1990

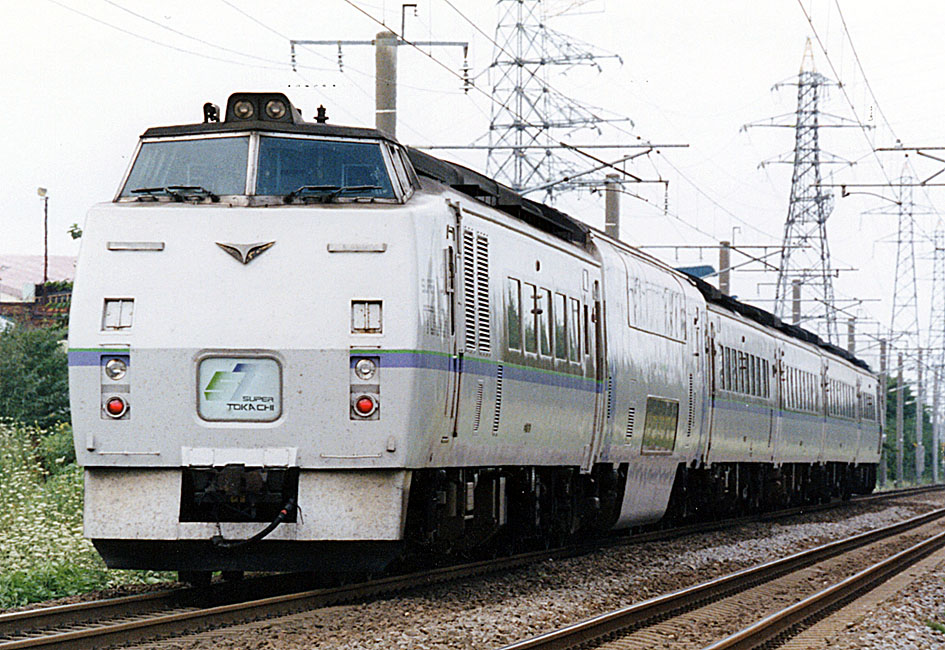
KiHa 183 series Super Tokachi service, 1993

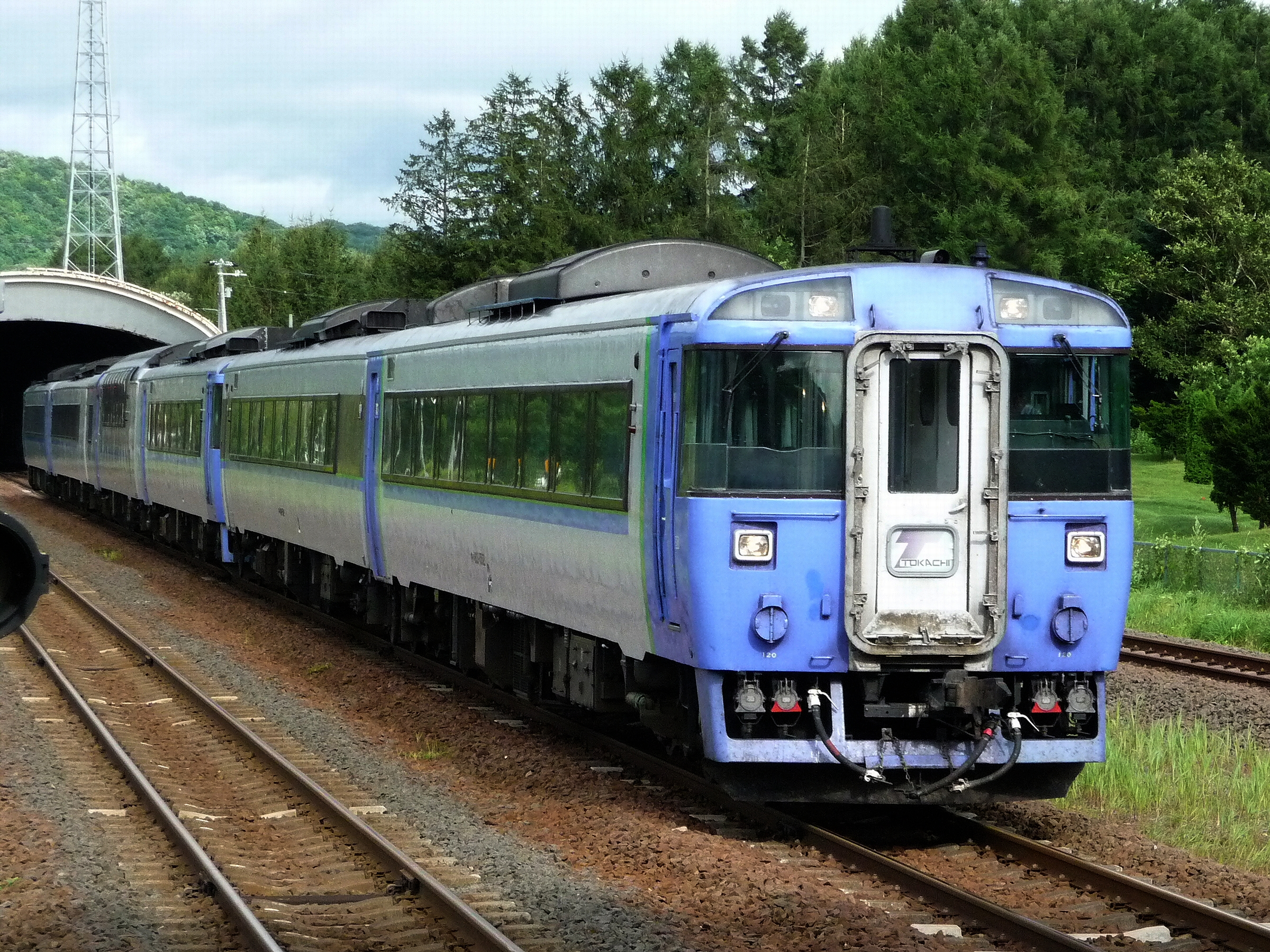
KiHa 183 series Tokachi service, August 2009

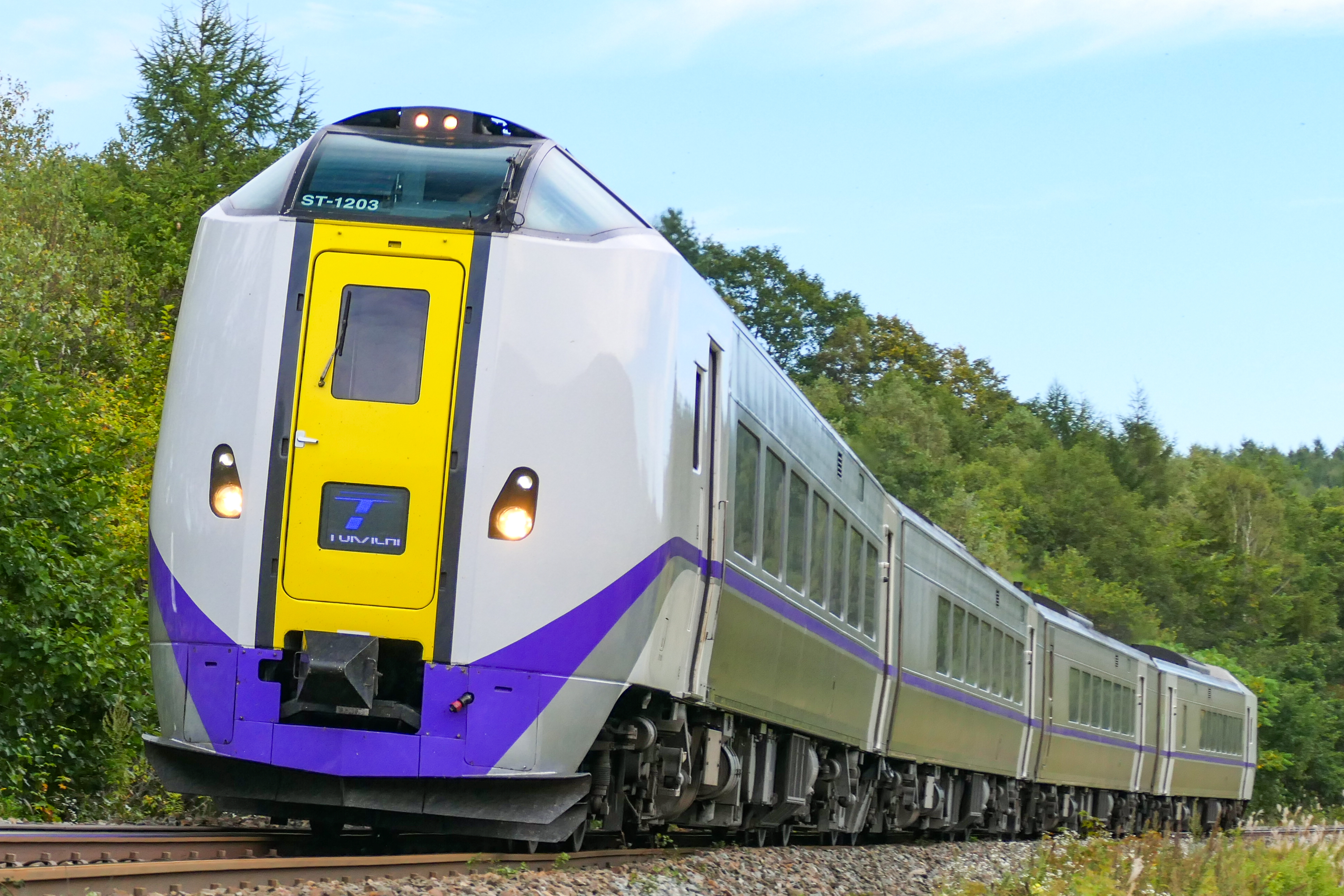
KiHa 261 series Tokachi service, September 2021

== History ==
The service commenced as the express Tokachi (十勝) on 1 February 1962, operating between Sapporo and Obihiro. The service continued until 30 September 1968.

The name was revived from 1 September 1990 as the Limited express Tokachi (とかち) using KiHa 183 series DMUs. From 27 July 1991, four Tokachi services were upgraded to become Super Tokachi using KiHa 183 series DMU sets including bilevel Green cars.

From 1 October 2007, new 5-car KiHa 261-1000 series tilting DMUs were introduced on Super Tokachi services, with KiHa 283 series tilting DMUs also used on some services.

From 1 October 2009, the remaining two Tokachi return services daily were upgraded to Super Tokachi using KiHa 261-1000 series DMUs. However, the service was returned to simply Tokachi from the start of the revised timetable on 14 March 2020.

== Discontinuation of catering services ==
From 1 November 2014, the refreshment trolley service and Green car complimentary drink service were discontinued, with refreshments sold instead in car 1. The refreshment service was discontinued entirely from 1 January 2015.
