= KiHa 281 series =

Japanese train type

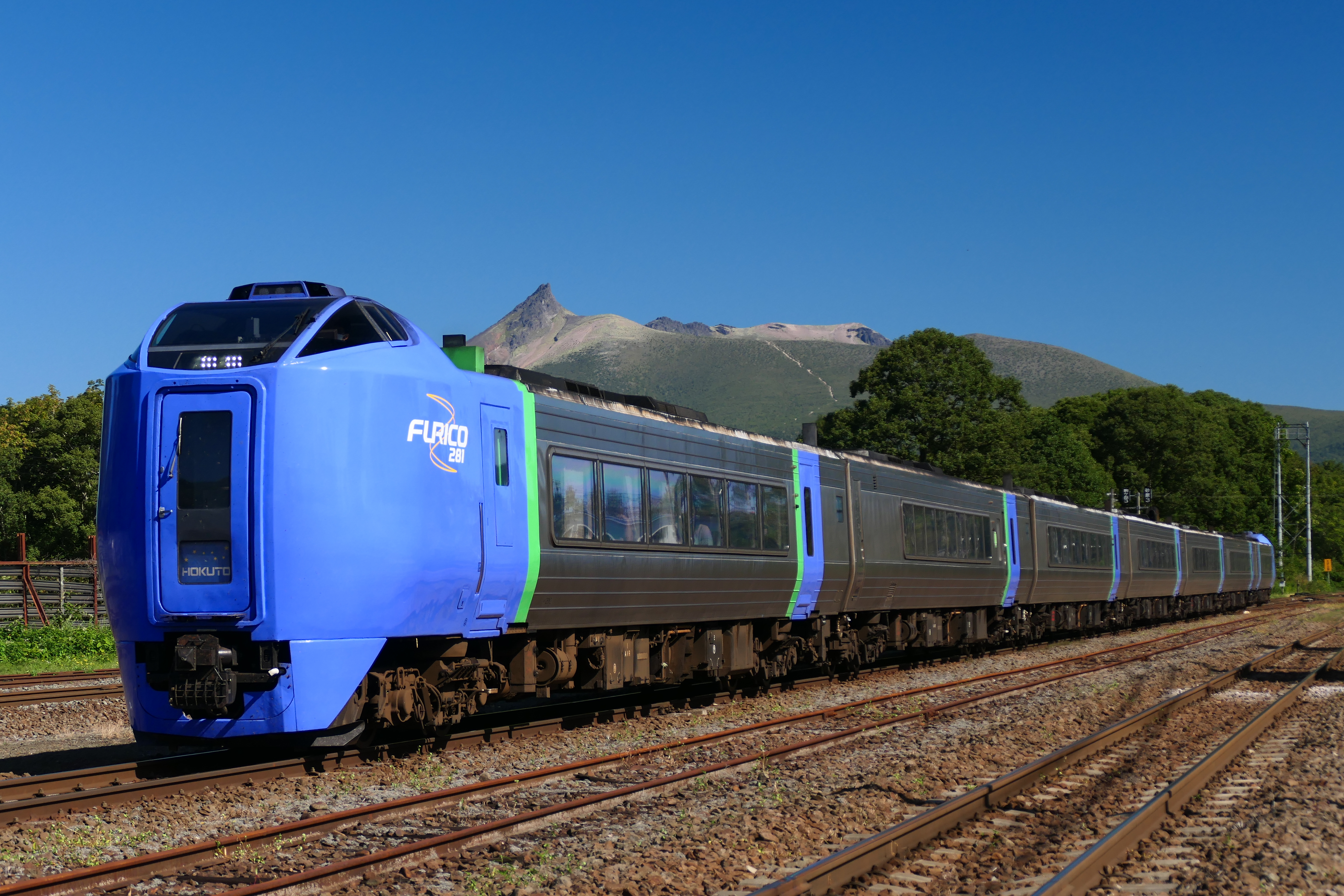
- KiHa 281 series on a Hokuto service, September 2022
- In service: 1994–2022
- Manufacturer: Fuji Heavy Industries
- Constructed: 1992–1993
- Number built: 27 vehicles
- Number preserved: 1 carriage
- Number scrapped: 26 carriages
- Formation: 7–8 cars per trainset
- Operator: JR Hokkaido
- Depot: Hakodate
- Lines served: Hakodate Main Line, Muroran Main Line, Chitose Line

Specifications
- Car body construction: Stainless steel
- Car length: 21.300 m (69 ft 10.6 in)
- Width: 2.863 m (9 ft 4.7 in) (production cars); 2.820 m (9 ft 3.0 in) (pre-production cars)
- Height: 4.077 m (13 ft 4.5 in)
- Doors: 1 per side
- Maximum speed: 130 km/h (81 mph)
- Prime mover: N-DMF11HZA (355 hp) x2 per car
- Transmission: Hydraulic
- Bogies: N-DT281A
- Track gauge: 1,067 mm (3 ft 6 in)

The KiHa 281 series (キハ281系) was a tilting diesel multiple unit (DMU) train type operated by Hokkaido Railway Company (JR Hokkaido) on Super Hokuto limited express services in Hokkaido, Japan, from 1994 until 2022. They were the first tilting trains to be operated by JR Hokkaido.

The "KiHa" designation derives from the classification system used by JNR. "Ki" indicates a diesel-powered vehicle, while "Ha" indicates an ordinary passenger car, as opposed to a green car.

== Formations ==
The fleet of 27 cars was normally formed into seven-car sets for use on Hokuto (named Super Hokuto until March 2020) limited express services operating between Hakodate and Sapporo, and formations were sometimes lengthened to eight cars during busy periods.

=== 7-car formations ===
7-car sets were normally formed as follows, with car 1 at the Sapporo end. Car 3 was a Green (first class) car.

Car No.	1	2	3	4	5	6	7
Numbering	KiHa 281	KiHa 280	KiRo 280	KiHa 280	KiHa 280	KiHa 280	KiHa 281

=== 8-car formations ===
Sets lengthened to 8 cars were normally formed as follows, with car 1 at the Sapporo end. Car 3 was a Green car.

Car No.	1	2	3	4	5	6	7	8
Numbering	KiHa 281	KiHa 280	KiRo 280	KiHa 280	KiHa 280	KiHa 280	KiHa 280	KiHa 281

== Individual vehicle types ==
=== KiHa 281-900 ===
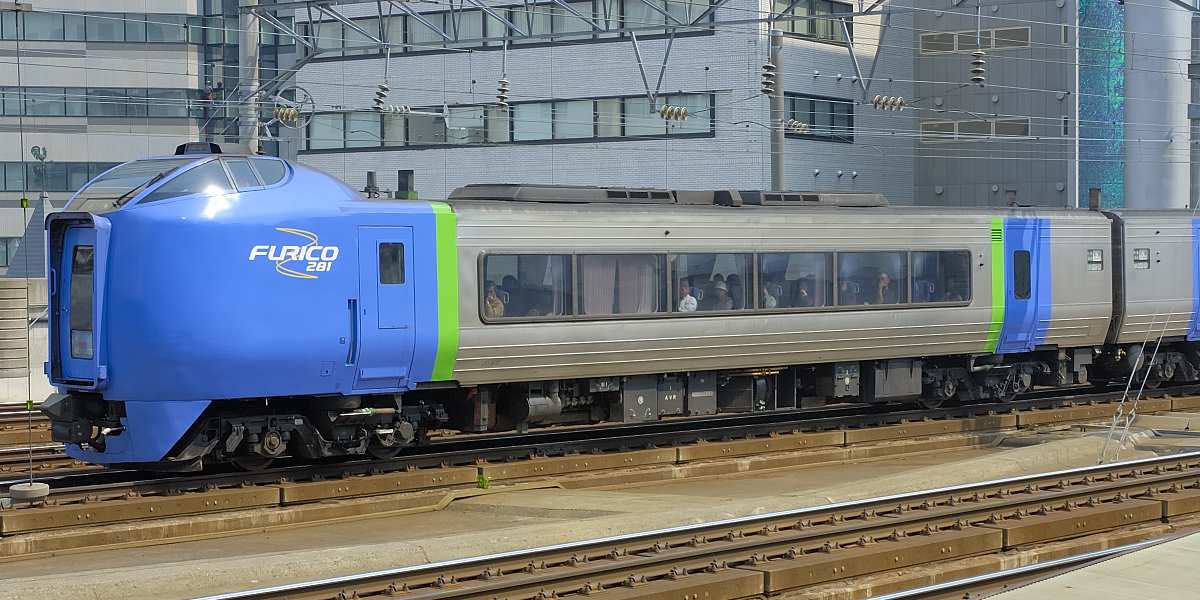
KiHa 281-902, April 2008

- Nos. KiHa 281-901–902 (2 vehicles)

Pre-production driving (control) cars built by Fuji Heavy Industries and delivered in January 1992. Seating capacity is 48, with toilets.

=== KiHa 280-900 ===
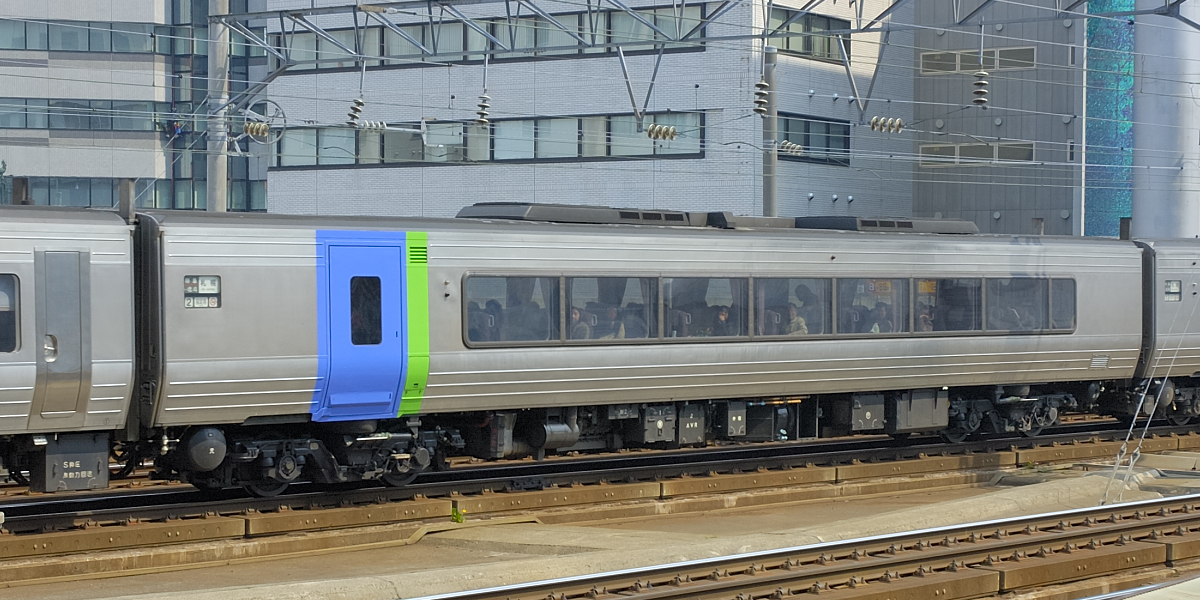
KiHa 280-901, April 2008

- No. KiHa 280-901 (1 vehicle)

Pre-production intermediate car built by Fuji Heavy Industries and delivered in October 1992. Seating capacity is 60. The width of the side doors was increased from 800 mm (31 in) on the KiHa 281-901–902 cars to 1,030 mm (41 in).

=== KiHa 281-0 ===
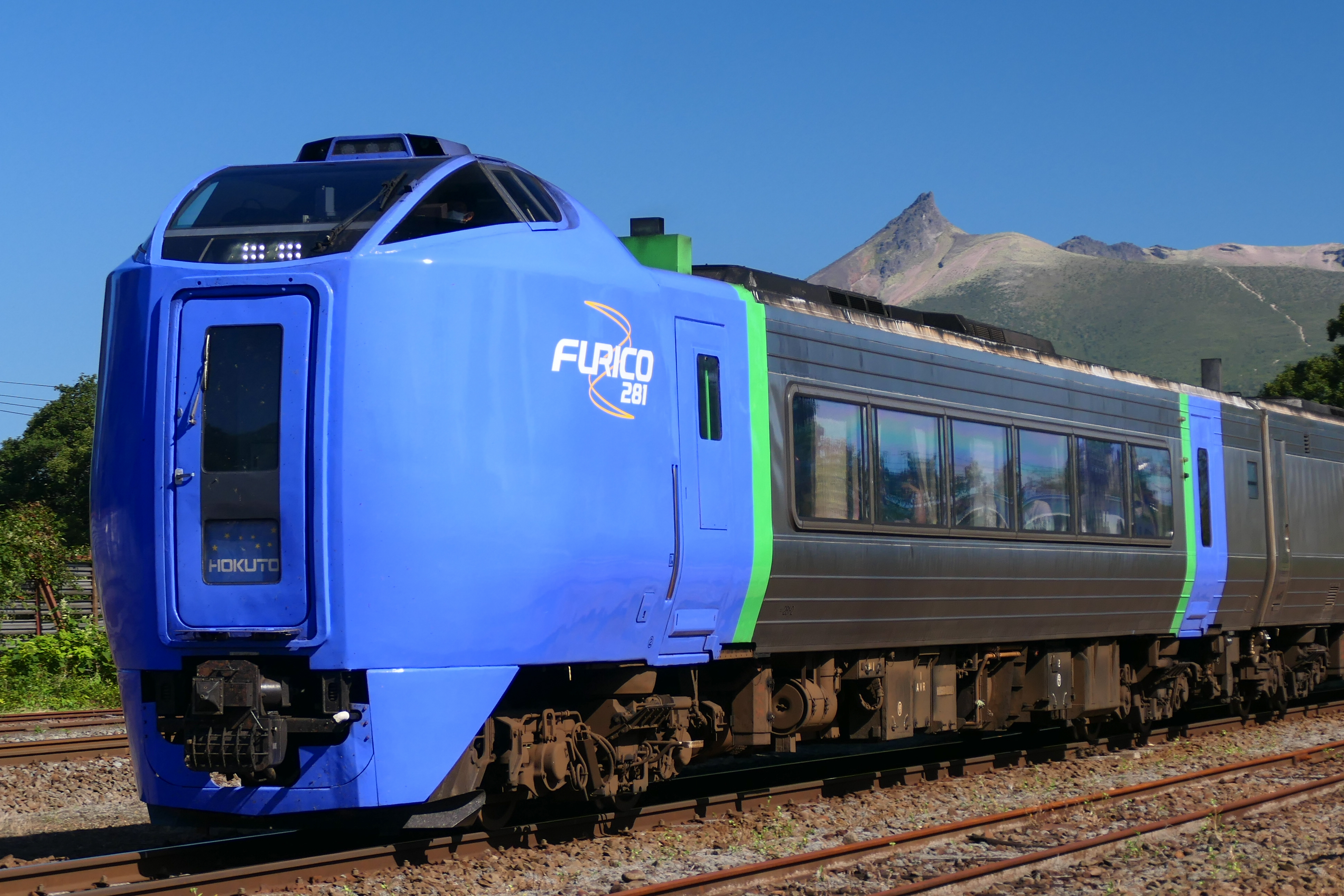
KiHa 281-2, September 2022

- Nos. KiHa 281-1–6 (6 vehicles)

Production driving (control) cars built by Fuji Heavy Industries and delivered from 1993. Seating capacity is 48, with toilets.

=== KiHa 280-0 ===
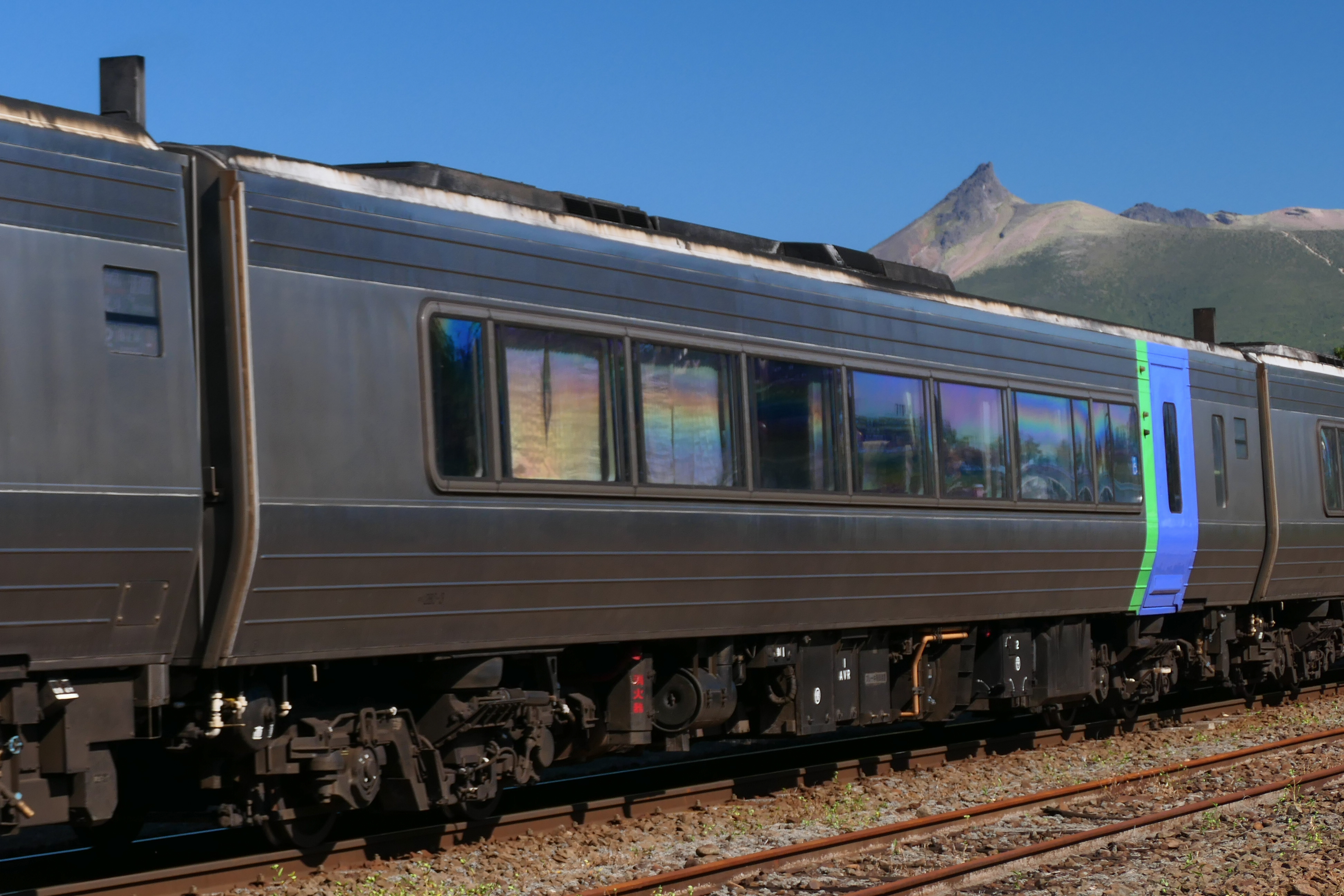
KiHa 280-3, September 2022

- Nos. KiHa 280-1–4 (4 vehicles)

Production intermediate cars built by Fuji Heavy Industries and delivered from 1993. Seating capacity is 51, with wheelchair space, universal access toilets, and a telephone.

=== KiHa 280-100 ===
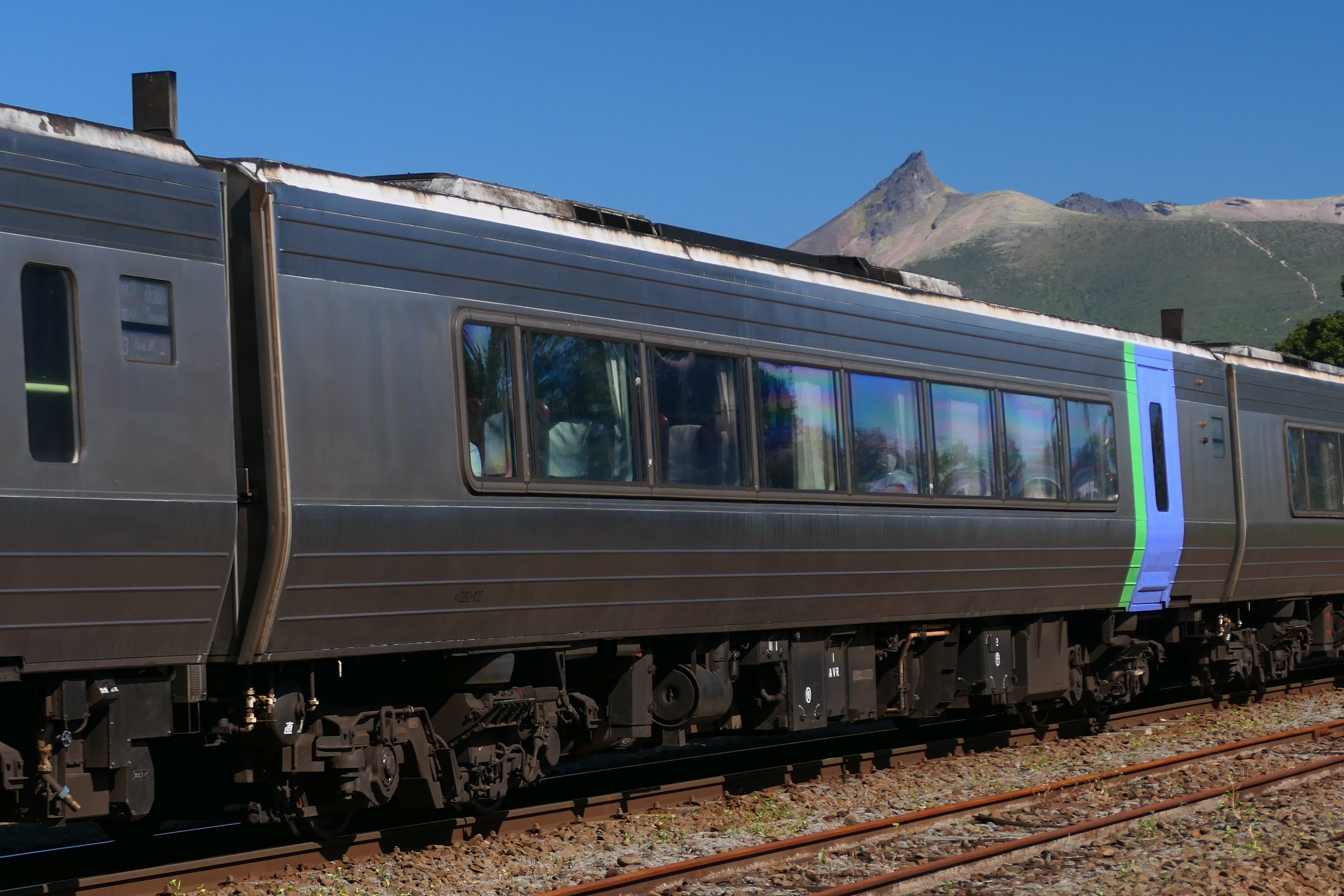
KiHa 280-103, September 2022

- Nos. KiHa 280-101–110 (10 vehicles)

Production intermediate cars built by Fuji Heavy Industries and delivered from 1993. Seating capacity is 60, with conductor's compartment, but no toilets.

=== KiRo 280-0 ===
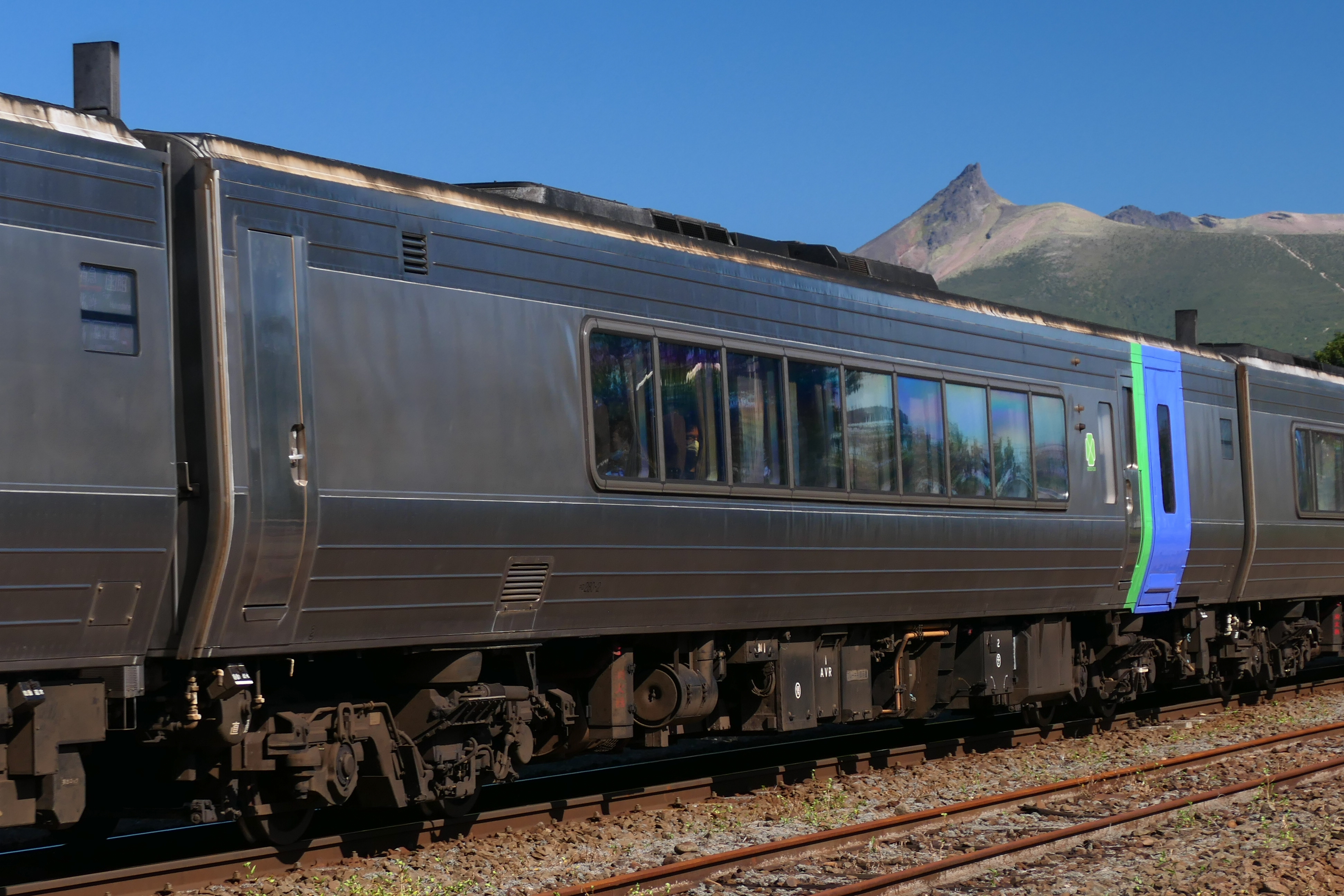
KiRo 280-2, September 2022

- Nos. KiRo 280-1–4 (4 vehicles)

Production Green (first class) cars built by Fuji Heavy Industries and delivered from 1993. Seating capacity is 26, with conductor's compartment, toilets, and a smoking area.

== Interior ==
Passenger seating used the same rotating/reclining seats as used on the 785 series EMUs. Seating is arranged 2+2 abreast in standard class and 2+1 abreast in Green class.

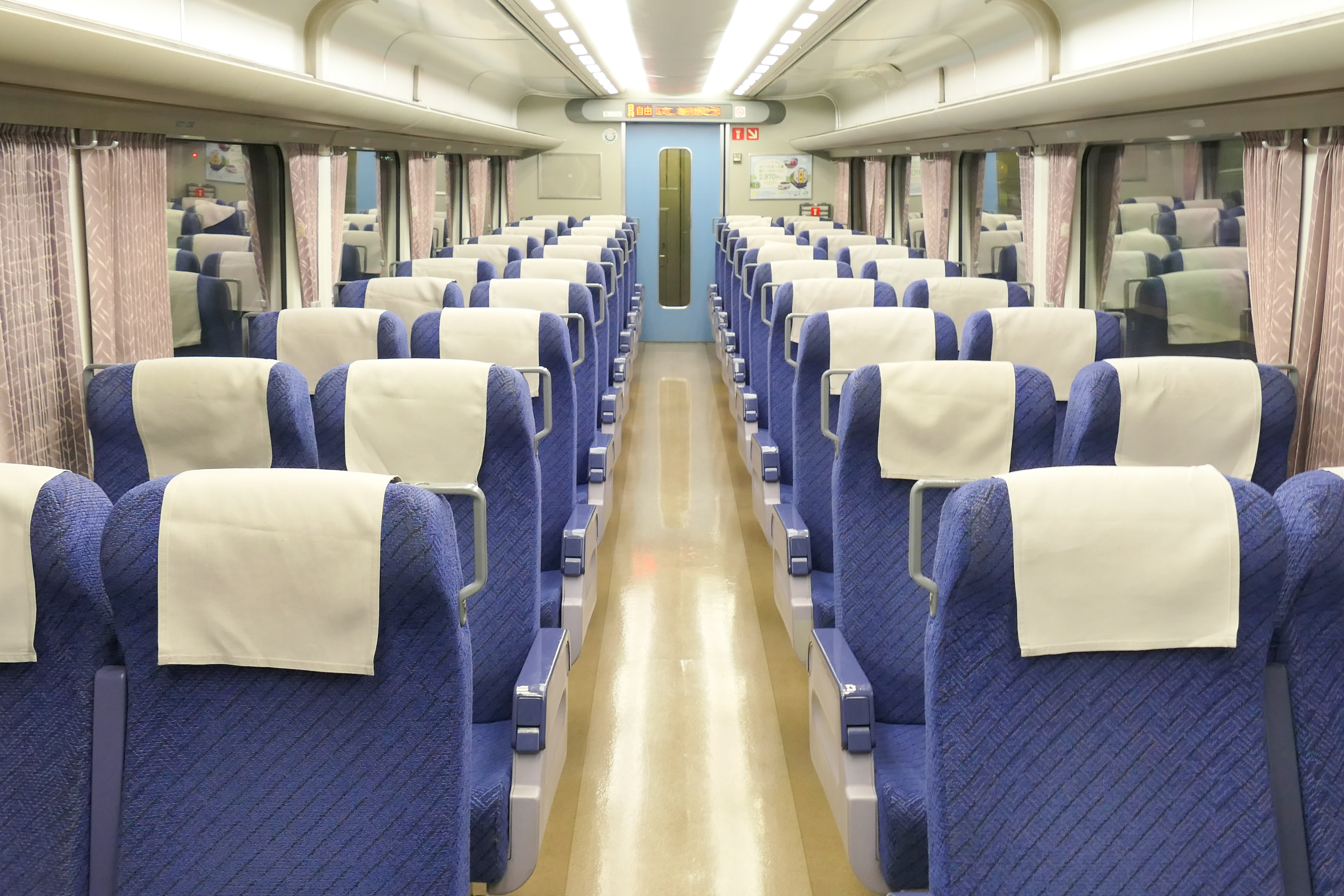
Original interior

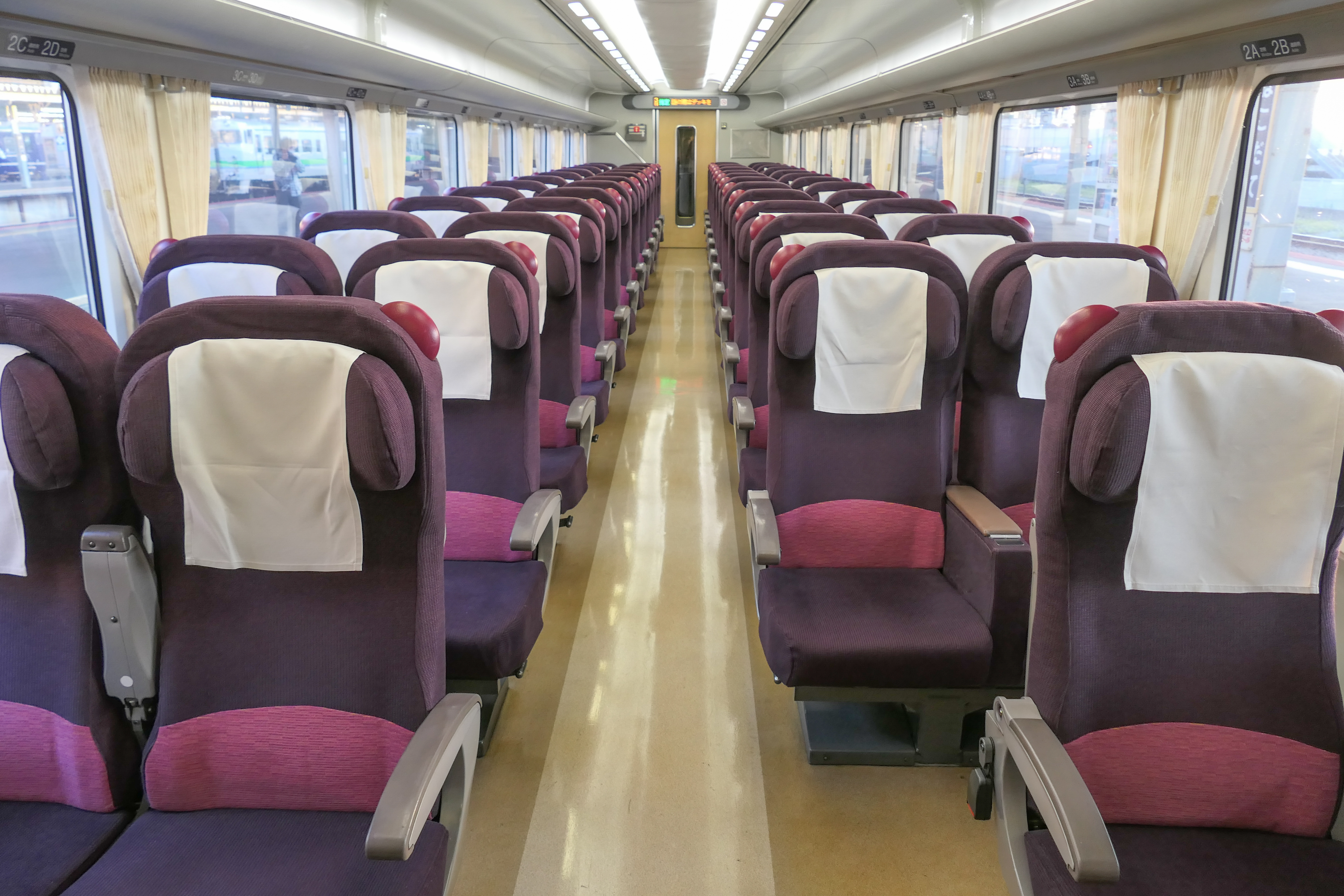
Standard interior

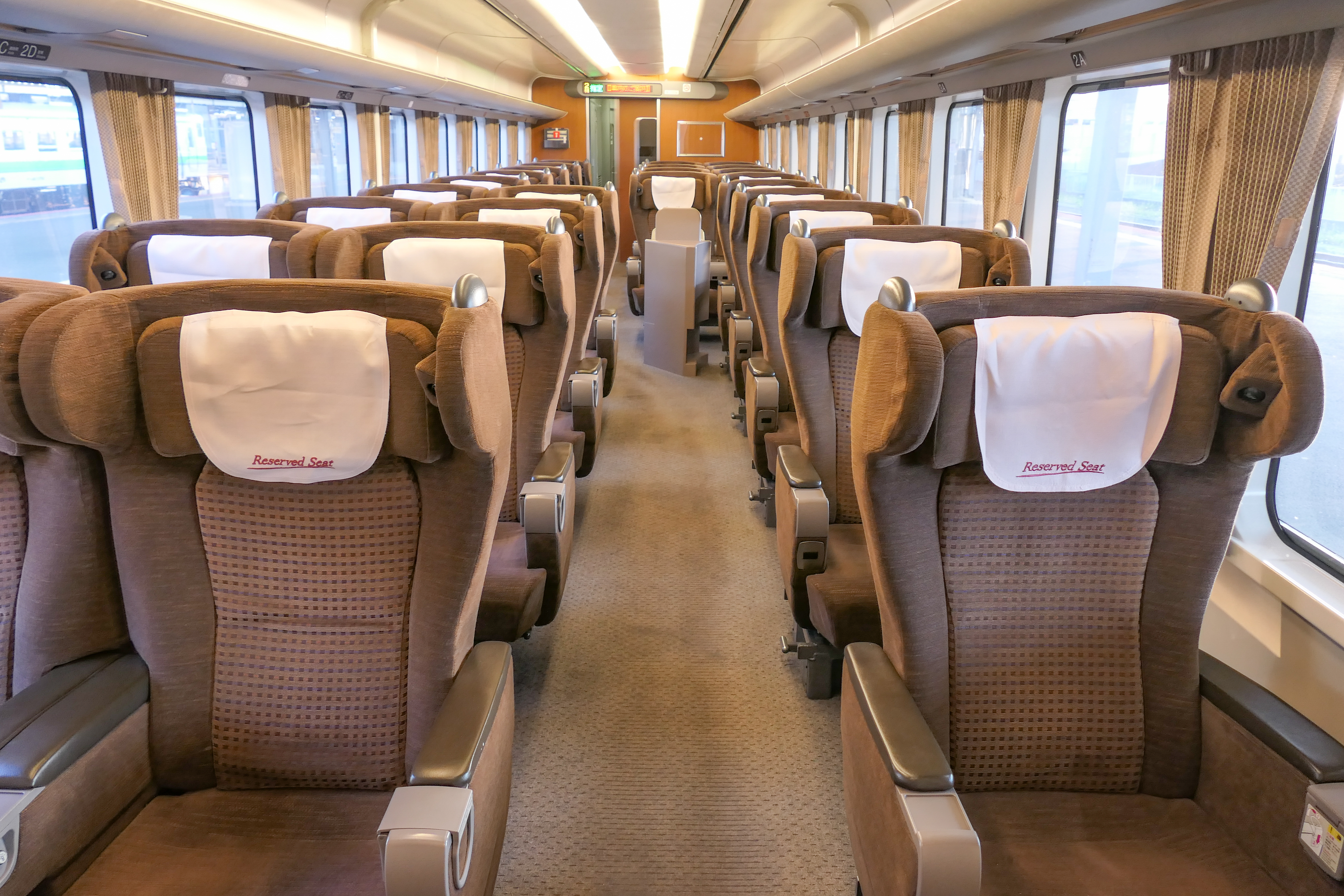
Green car interior

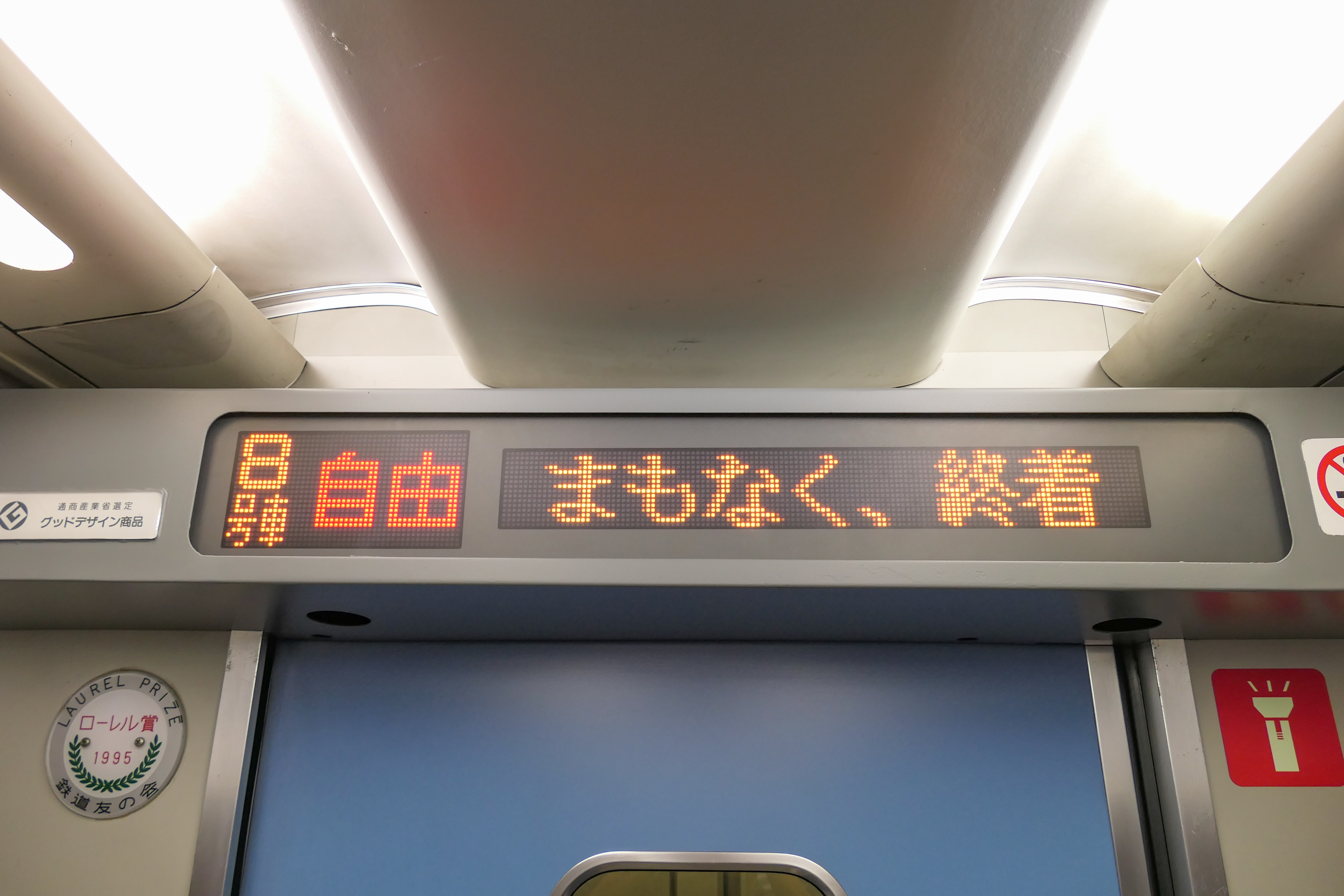
Passenger information display

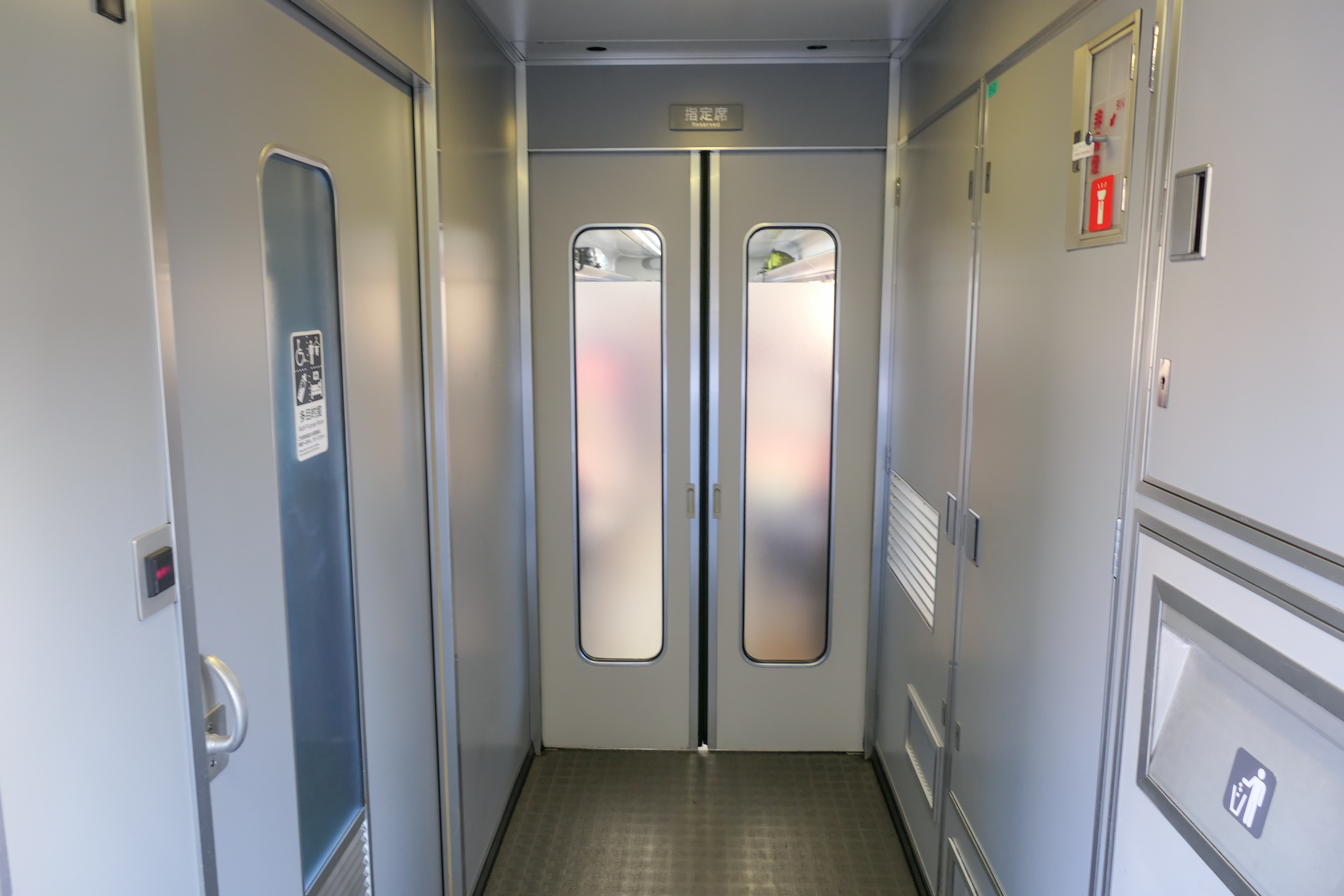
Passenger passage

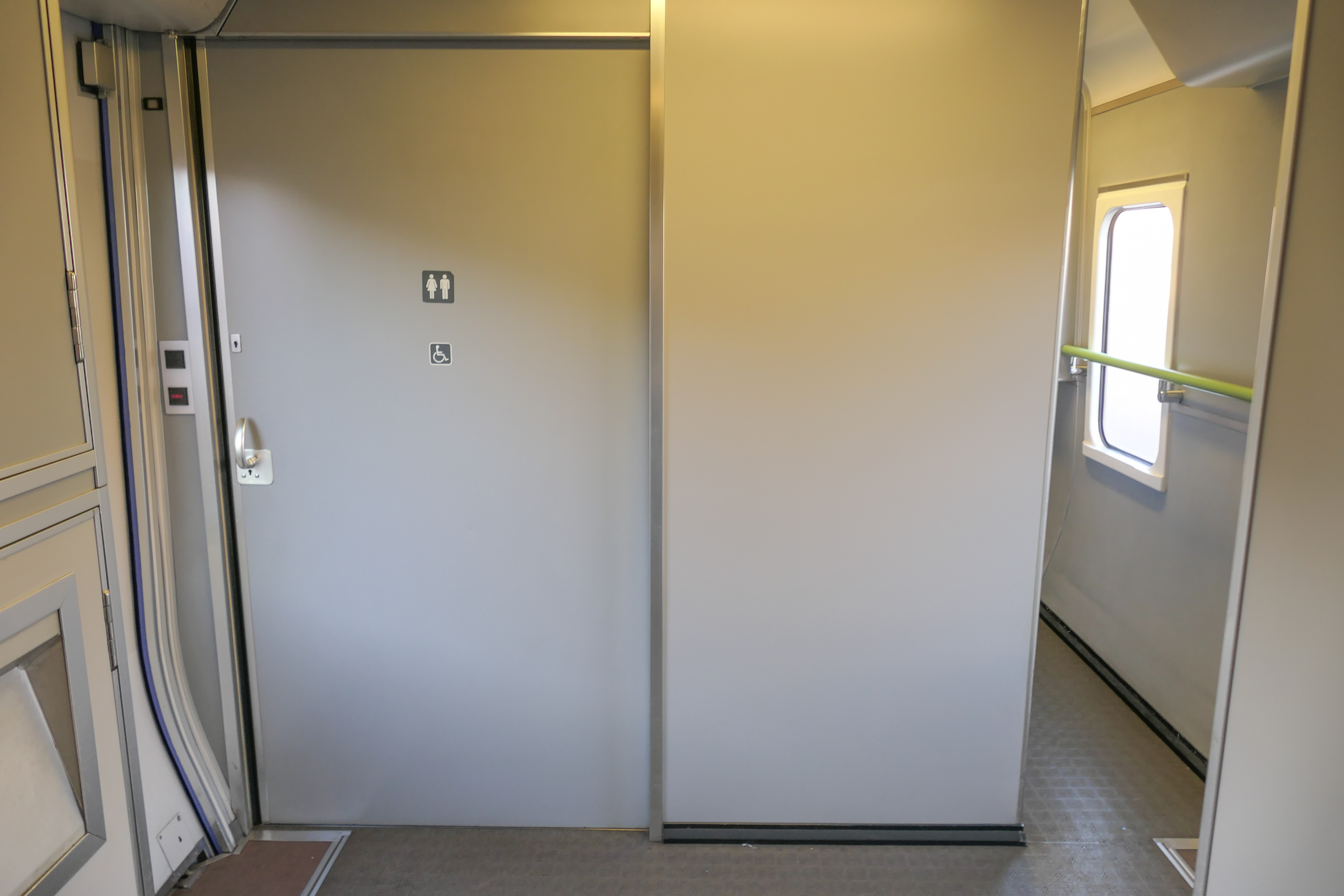
Universal design toilet

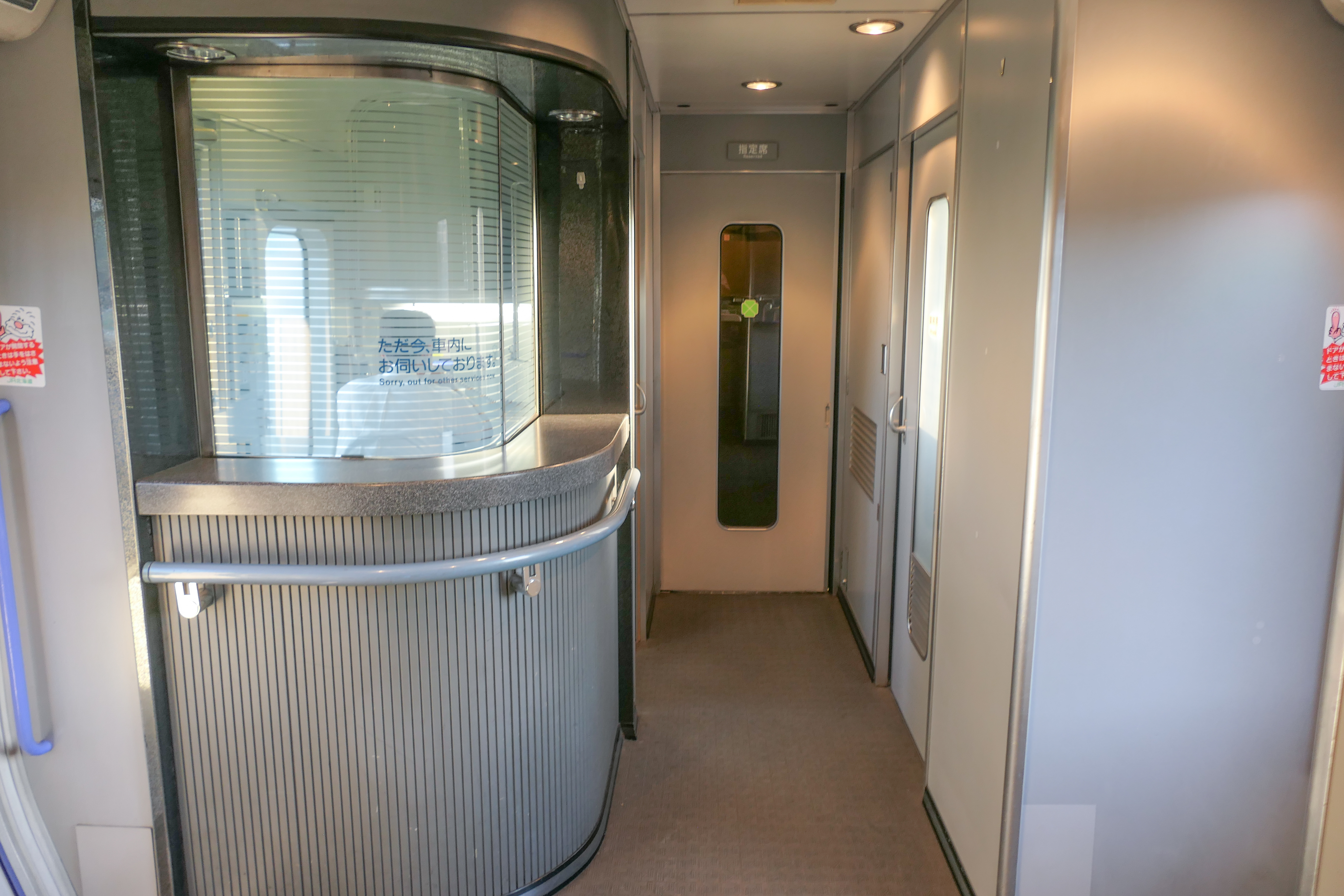
Conductor's room

Green car accommodation is scheduled to undergo a programme of refurbishment.

== History ==
=== Pre-production sets ===
Two pre-production cars, KiHa 281-901 and KiHa 281-902, were delivered from Fuji Heavy Industries in January 1992 for evaluation and testing. A pre-production intermediate car, KiHa 280-901, also built by Fuji Heavy Industries, was delivered in October 1992 to form a 3-car set. The first two cars delivered used the same roller-tilting mechanism on the bogies as used on the earlier JR Shikoku 2000 series DMUs, whereas the third car delivered used a bearing-guide system. The pre-production 3-car train underwent test-running to evaluate the two different systems in the harsh winter conditions of Hokkaido. The later bearing-guide tilt mechanism proved superior, and this system was used on subsequent production trains delivered from 1993.

=== Entry into service ===
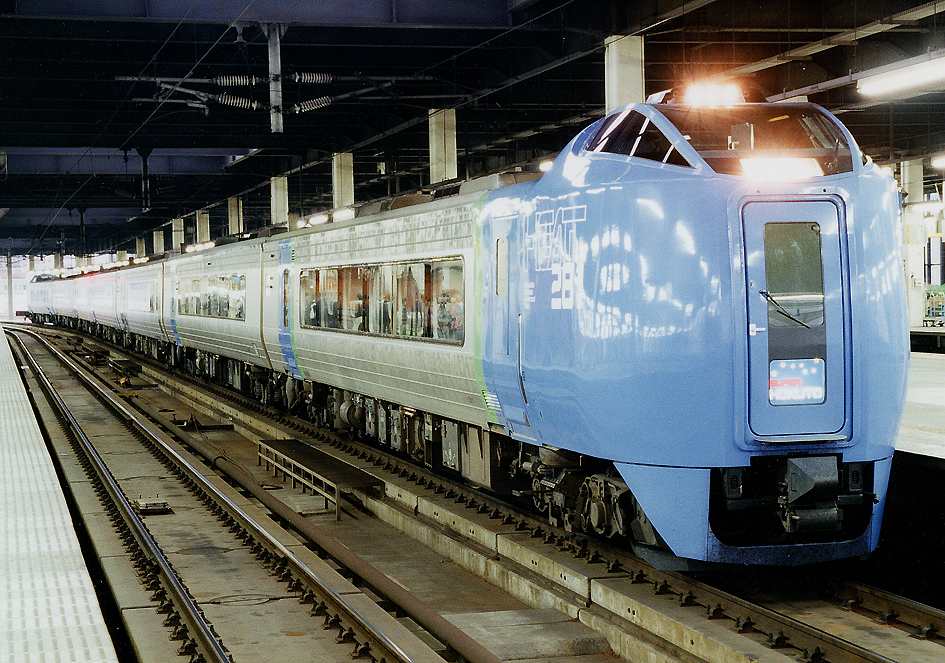
KiHa 281 series formation on a Super Hokuto service at Sapporo Station, 1994

The KiHa 281 series entered revenue service from the start of the revised timetable on 1 March 1994. The new tilting trains operated at a maximum speed of 130 km/h (81 mph), reducing the journey time for the 318 km (198 mi) distance between Hakodate and Sapporo to 3 hours, shaving 30 minutes off the journey time for Hokuto services operated by KiHa 183 series DMUs.

The original "HEAT281" logo on cab sides of the pre-production trains was changed from "Hokkaido Experimental Advanced Train" to "Hokkaido Express Advanced Train" with the arrival of the production cars. This logo was later changed to "Furico 281" to match the style used on the newer KiHa 283 series trains.

=== Laurel Prize ===
The KiHa 281 series was awarded the Laurel Prize in 1995 for its outstanding functional and design features.

=== Withdrawal ===
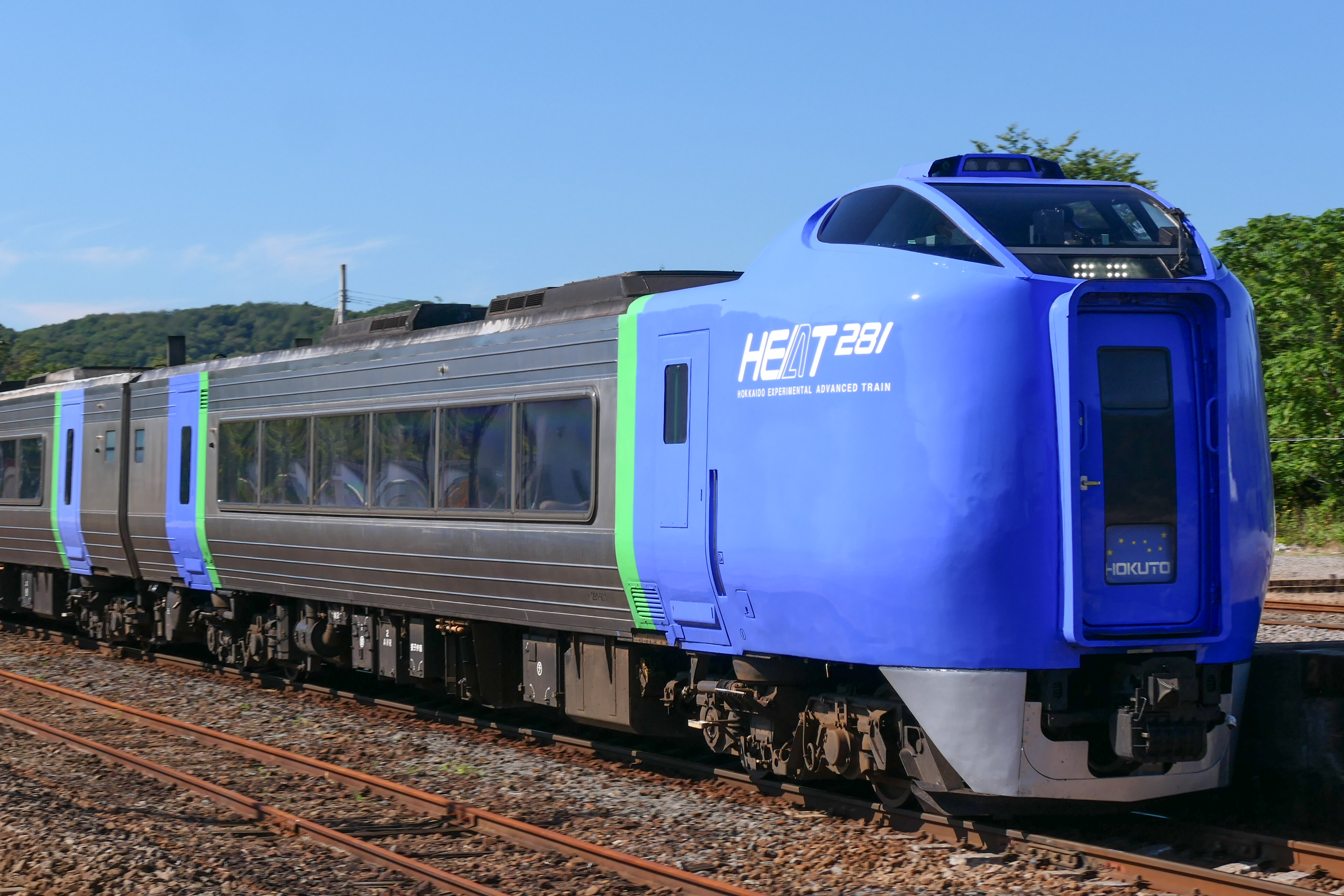
KiHa 281-901, September 2022

On 13 July 2022, JR Hokkaido announced its plans to withdraw the KiHa 281 series from operation and replace the type with the KiHa 261 series. The KiHa 281 series made its final run in regular service on 30 September 2022. Pre-production car KiHa 281-901 was repainted to feature the original livery and "HEAT281" logo in preparation for a chartered final-run train that will run between 22 and 23 October.

== Preserved Examples ==
1 car is stored in the Naebo Workshop in Sapporo.
