= Hokuto =

Hokuto may refer to:

- Hokuto Shichisei or the Big Dipper, the Japanese name for the asterism
- Hokuto (train) the name of train services operating in Hokkaido, Japan
- Hokuto Corporation, a Tokyo-based Japanese adult video company
- Hokuto (Street Fighter), a character in the Street Fighter EX video game series
- Hokuto no Ken or Fist of the North Star; the title refers primarily to "Hokuto Shinken", a deadly martial art school
- Hokuto Bank, a Japanese bank headquartered in Akita
- Hokuto (apple), a variety of apple that originated in Aomori, Japan

== Places ==
Hokuto (北都) means "northern city" in Japanese. It may refer to:

- Hokuto, Yamanashi, a city in Yamanashi Prefecture, Japan
- Hokuto, Hokkaido, a city in Hokkaido, Japan
- Japanese name of Beitou, Taiwan
- Nickname for Asahikawa, Hokkaido, Japan
- Heian-kyō, a former capital of Japan, now Kyoto. Described as the northern capital in contrast to Heijō-kyō, the southern capital
- Kyoto, a nickname derived from its former status as capital of Japan

== People ==
- Akira Hokuto (北斗 晶; born 1967), Japanese retired professional wrestler
- Hokuto Iboshi (違星 北斗; 1901–1929), Ainu waka poet and social activist
- Hokuto Konishi (born 1984), contestant on So You Think You Can Dance and a band member
- Hokuto Matsumura (松村 北斗; born 1995), Japanese actor and singer
- Hokuto Nakamura (中村 北斗; born 1985), Japanese footballer
- Hokuto Omori (大森 北斗; born 1995), Japanese professional wrestler
- Hokuto Shimoda (下田 北斗; born 1991), Japanese footballer
- Hokuto Yokoyama (横山 北斗; born 1963), Japanese politician
- Hokuto Yoshino (吉野 北人; born 1997), Japanese singer, performer and actor

=== Characters ===
- Hokuto, a character from B'TX
- Hokuto Sumeragi, a character in Tokyo Babylon and X/1999
- Hokuto Dan, or Dyna Red, a character from Kagaku Sentai Dynaman
- Seiji Hokuto, Ultraman Ace's alter ego alongside Yuko Minami from the 1972 namesake tokusatsu
- Hokuto Kaneshiro, a character from Rosario + Vampire
- Hokuto, a character from Street Fighter EX
- Hokuto Furukizu, a character in the video game Yandere Simulator
- Hokuto Hidaka, a character from the mobile game Ensemble Stars!
- Hokuto Ijuuin, a character from the games The Idolmaster 2 and The Idolmaster SideM
