= Beidou (disambiguation) =

Beidou (Chinese: 北斗; lit. 'northern dipper') is the Chinese name of Big Dipper.

Beidou may also refer to:

- The BeiDou Navigation Satellite System, a Chinese satellite navigation system
- A character in 2020 video game Genshin Impact
- Beidou, Changhua, an urban township in Changhua County, Taiwan
- Beidou, Fengshun, a town in Fengshun County, Guangdong, China

== See also ==
- Baidu
- Beidu (disambiguation)
