= Hokuto (train) =

Japanese passenger train service

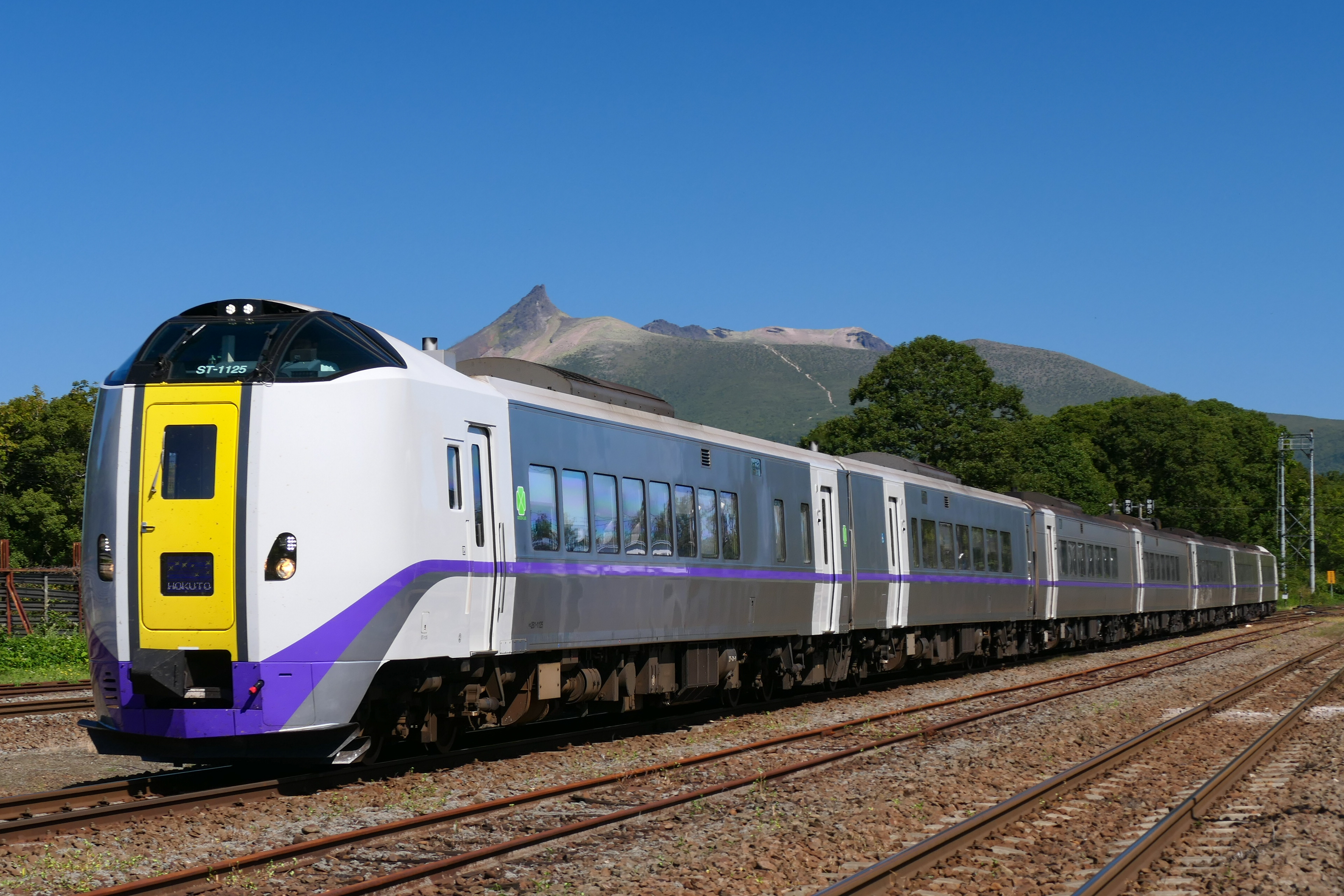
- KiHa 261 series DMU on Hokuto service

Overview
- Service type: Limited express
- Status: Operational
- First service: 1949 (Express); 1965 (Limited express); 1994 (Super Hokuto)
- Last service: 2020 (Super Hokuto)
- Current operator(s): JR Hokkaido

Route
- Termini: Hakodate; Sapporo
- Stops: 15
- Distance travelled: 318.7 km (198.0 mi)
- Average journey time: 3 hours 40 minutes approx
- Service frequency: 12 return workings daily
- Line(s) used: Hakodate Main Line (Hakodate-Oshamambe) Muroran Main Line (Oshamambe-Tomakomai) Chitose Line (Tomakomai-Sapporo)

On-board services
- Class(es): Standard + Green
- Disabled access: Yes
- Sleeping arrangements: None
- Catering facilities: None
- Observation facilities: None
- Entertainment facilities: None
- Other facilities: Toilets

Technical
- Rolling stock: KiHa 261 series
- Operating speed: 130 km/h (81 mph)
- Track owner(s): JR Hokkaido

The Hokuto (北斗) is a limited express train service that runs between Sapporo and Hakodate in Hokkaido, operated by Hokkaido Railway Company (JR Hokkaido). The journey time of the Hokuto is approximately 3 hours 40 minutes.

Super Hokuto services started on 1 March 1994, and cut journey time by about 30 minutes due to the higher speeds through the many curves of the line between Sapporo and Hakodate. All trains have been renamed to Hokuto since 2020, after the KiHa 183 series used on the original Hokuto service was replaced with KiHa 261 series.

== Stops ==
Trains stop at the following stations:

Station		Connections	Location
H75	Hakodate	Hakodate Main Line; Hakodate Liner Line	
H74	Goryōkaku	Hakodate Main Line; Hakodate Liner Line	
H70	Shin-Hakodate-Hokuto	Hokkaido Shinkansen; Hakodate Liner Line	
H67	Ōnuma-Kōen		
H62	Mori		
H54	Yakumo		
H47	Oshamambe		
H41	Tōya		
H38	Date-Mombetsu		
H32	Higashi-Muroran		
H28	Noboribetsu		
H23	Shiraoi		
H18	Tomakomai		
H14	Minami-Chitose		
H05	Shin-Sapporo		
01	Sapporo		

Stops may differ depending on the train.

== Rolling stock ==
The Hokuto is operated by 7-car KiHa 261 series DMUs, with car 1 at the Hakodate (southern) end. All cars are no-smoking. Until 30 September 2022, the Hokuto was also operated by KiHa 281 series DMUs.

For departures using KiHa 281 series, cars 1, 2 and 4 to 7 were ordinary-class cars with 2+2 seating, and car 3 was a "Green" car with 2+1 seating.

Car No.	1	2	3	4	5	6	7
Accommodation	Reserved	Reserved	Green	Reserved	Reserved	Reserved	Reserved
Facilities	Toilets		Toilets		Wheelchair space, accessible toilet		Toilets

For departures using KiHa 261 series, car 1 is a "Green" car with 2+1 seating, and cars 2 to 7 are ordinary-class cars with 2+2 seating.

Car No.	1	2	3	4	5	6	7
Accommodation	Green	Reserved	Reserved	Reserved	Reserved	Reserved	Reserved
Facilities		Wheelchair space, accessible toilet	Toilets	Toilets	Toilets	Toilets	

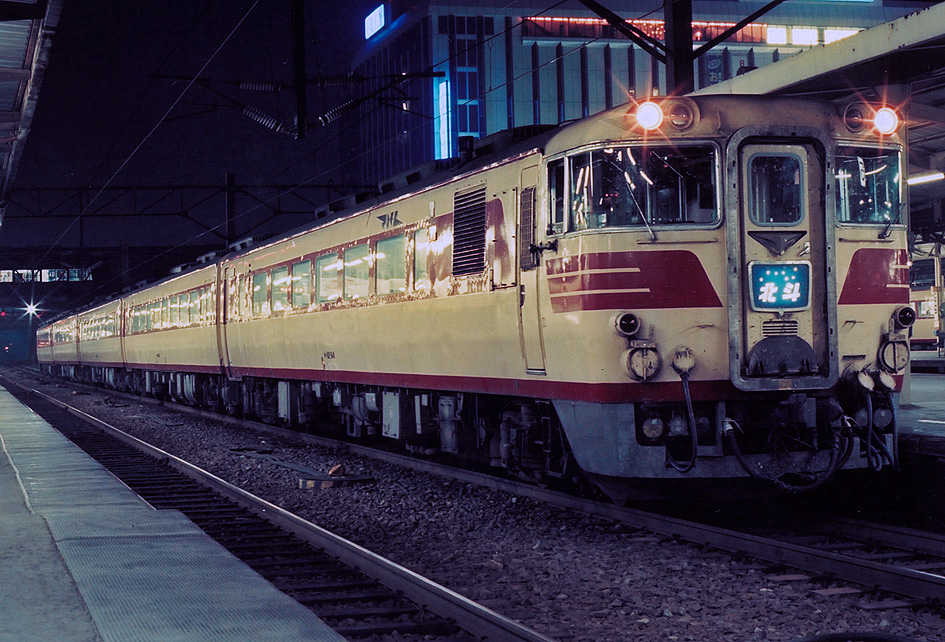
A KiHa 80 series DMU on a Hokuto service circa 1986

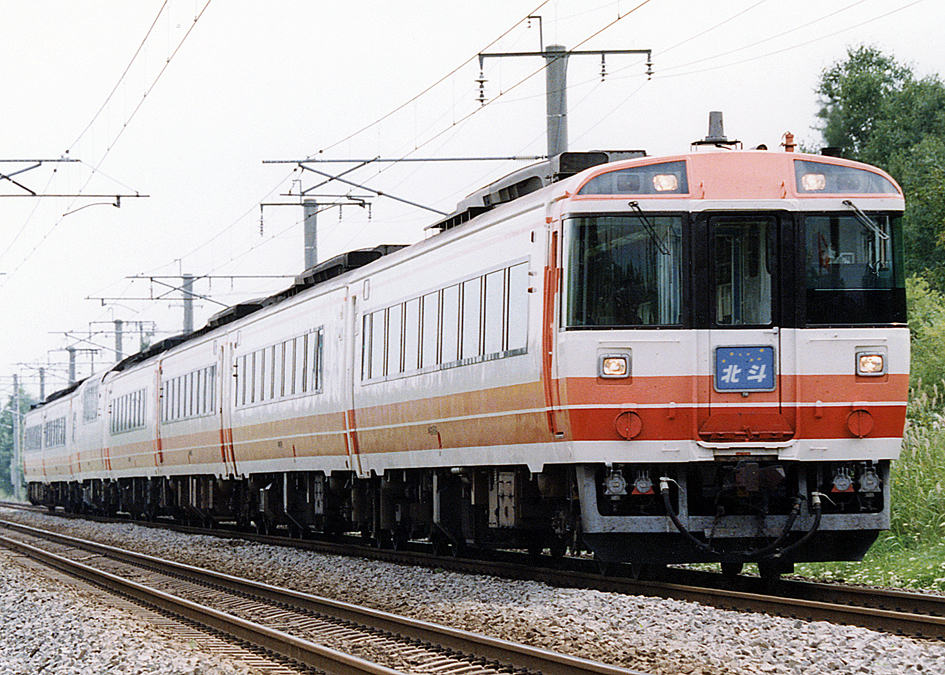
A KiHa 183 series DMU on a Hokuto service in 1992

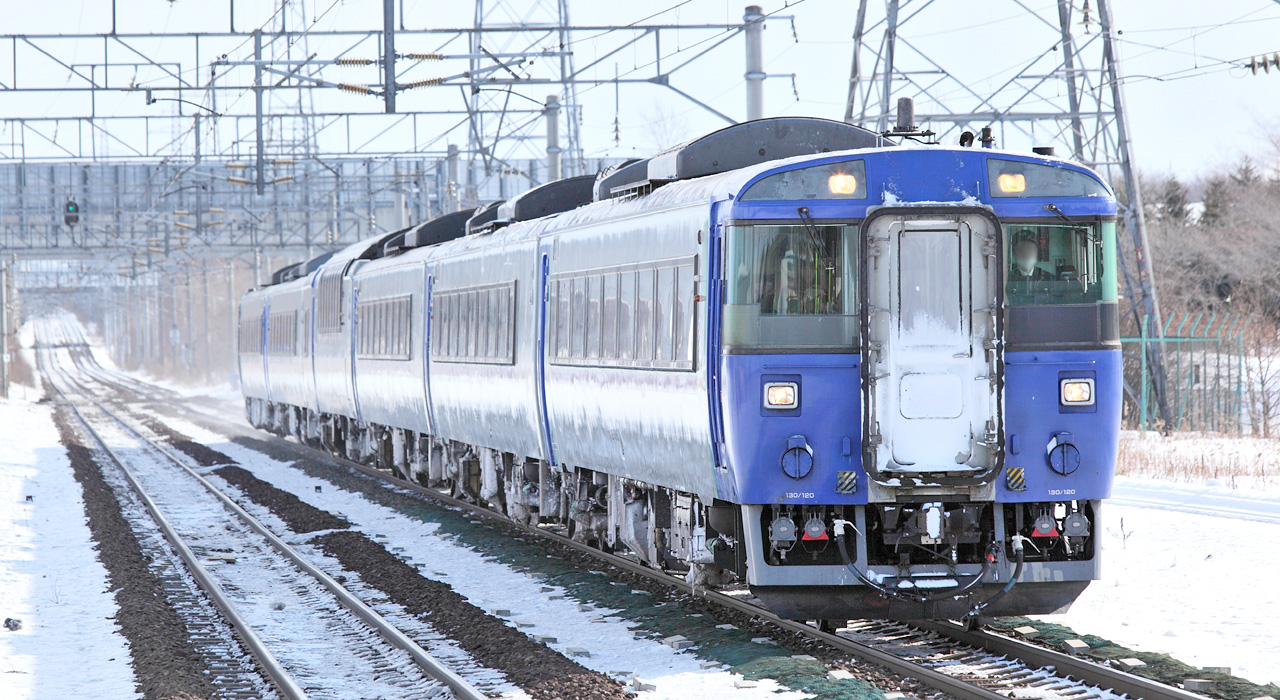
A KiHa 183 series DMU on a Hokuto service in February 2010

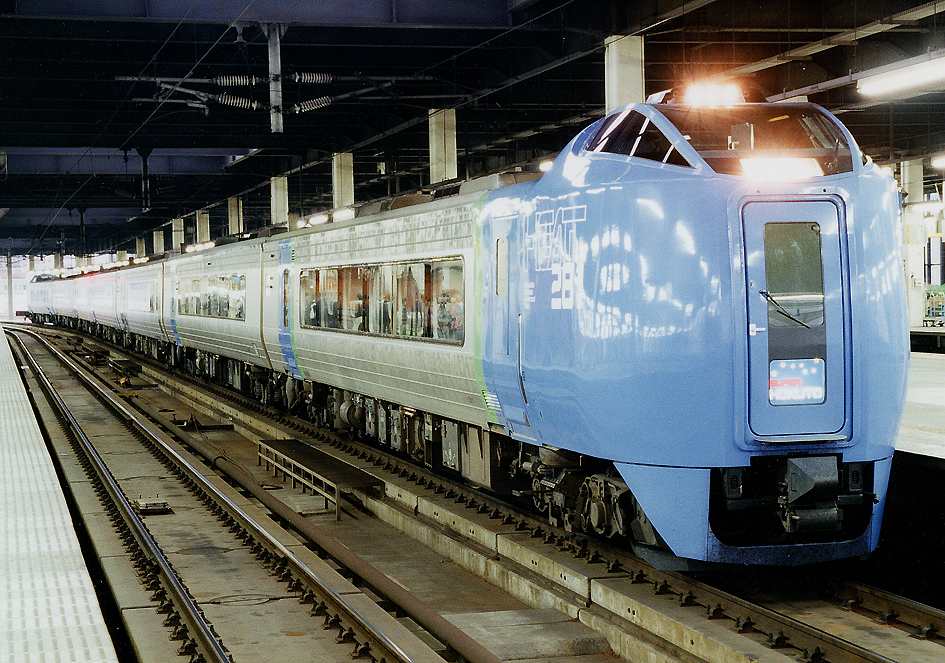
A KiHa 281 series DMU on a Super Hokuto service in 1994

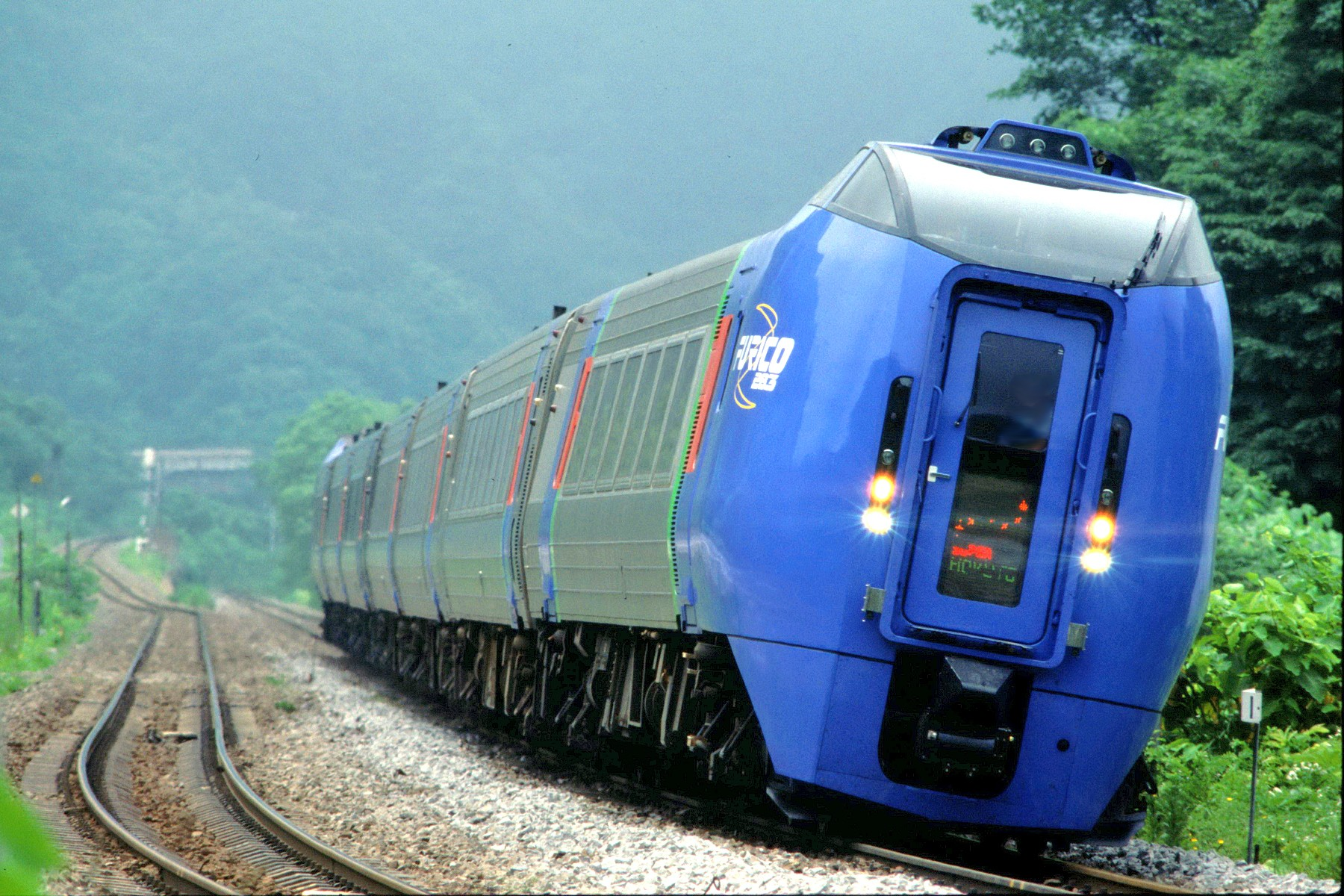
A KiHa 283 series DMU on a Super Hokuto service in June 2001

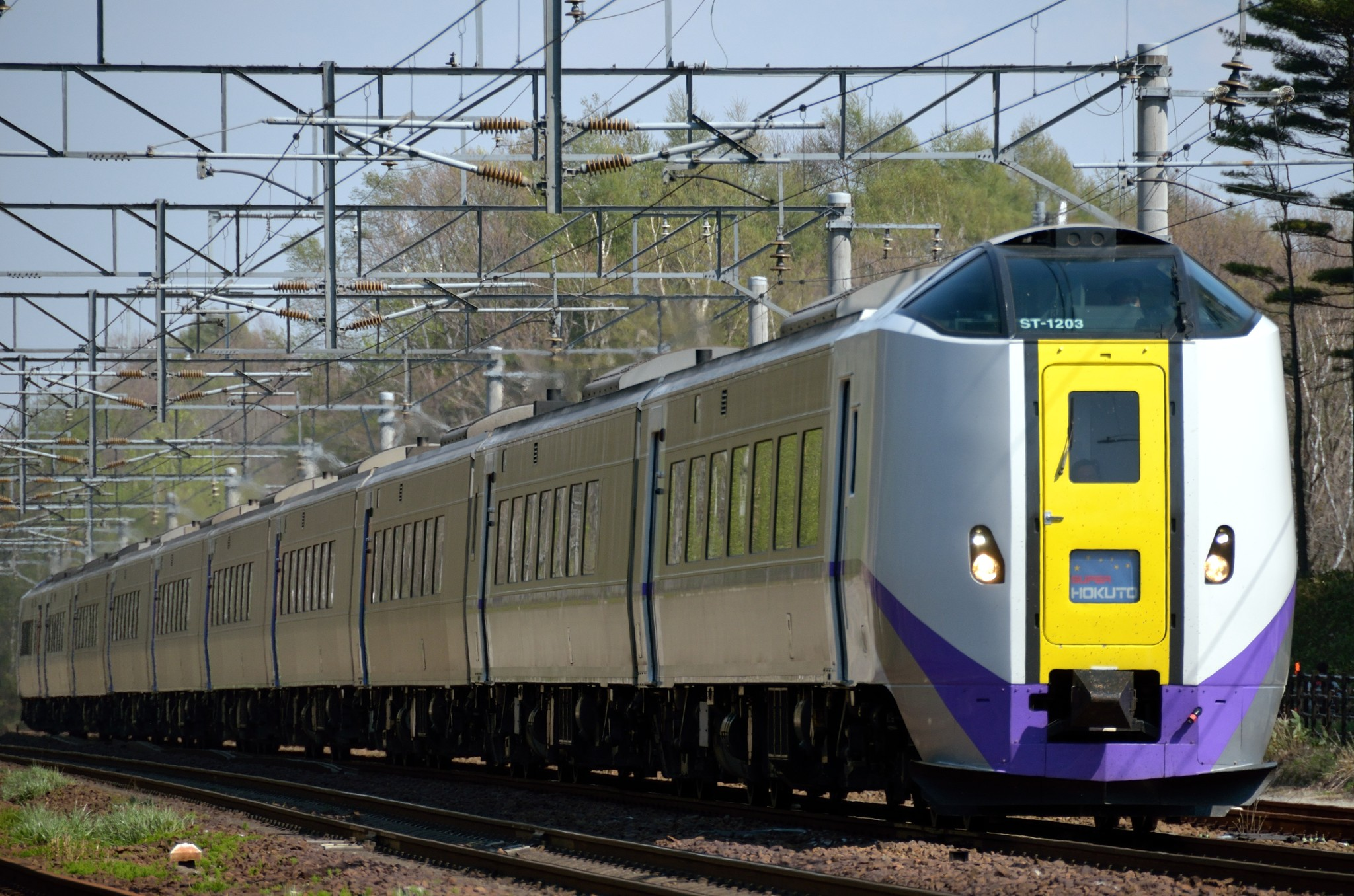
A KiHa 261-1000 series DMU on a Super Hokuto service in May 2016
