= Hokkaido Colliery and Railway Company =

Railway company in Japan

- Native name: 北海道炭礦鉄道
- Romanized name: Hokkaidō Tankō Tetsudō
- Founded: November 18 1889
- Founder: Government of Japan
- Defunct: October 1 1906
- Headquarters: Sapporo, Hokkaido, Empire of Japan
- Key people: Kaemon Takashima (Chairman); Kakugoro Inoue (Senior managing director)

Hokkaido Colliery and Railway Company (北海道炭礦鉄道, Hokkaidō Tankō Tetsudō) was a company engaged in coal mining, railway operation and shipping in Hokkaidō, Japan.

The company was established in 1889 when the state-owned Horonai Coal Mine (幌内炭鉱, Horonai Tankō) and Horonai Railway were sold to the company. The company developed coal mines and transported coal to consumers by its own railways and a fleet of steamships.

The railway of the company was nationalized on October 1, 1906 under the Railway Nationalization Act. At this time the company was renamed Hokkaido Colliery & Steamship Co., Ltd. (北海道炭礦汽船, Hokkaidō Tankō Kisen), which continued mining until 1995 and is in business of coal importing from Russia as of 2014.

== Railway ==
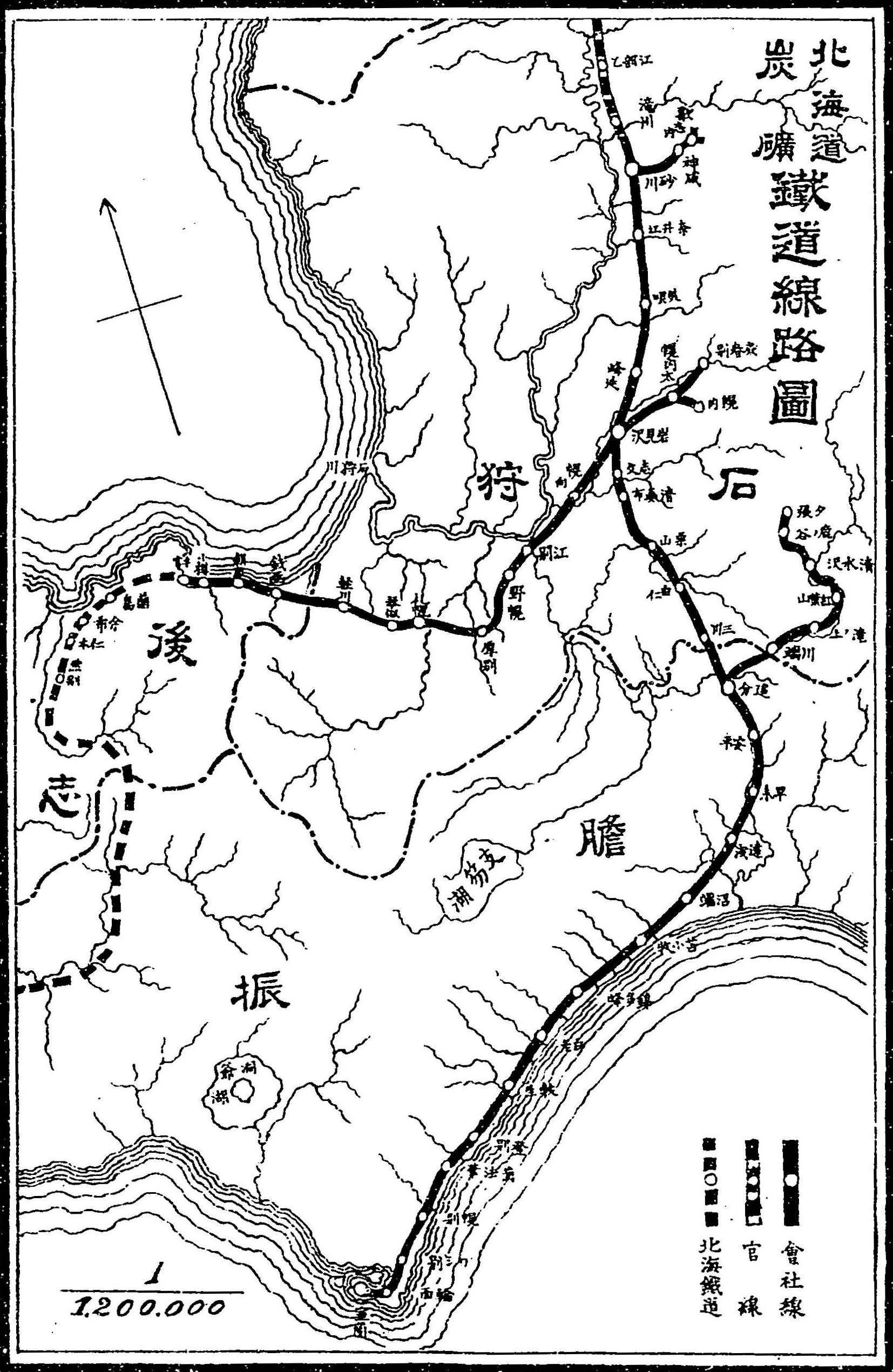
A 1903 map of the company's railway routes

=== List of lines and stations ===
As of September 30, 1906

==== Muroran – Temiya ====
The Muroran–Iwamizawa section and the Iwamizawa–Otaru section are part of the Muroran Main Line and the Hakodate Main Line respectively today. The remaining Otaru–Temiya section became the Temiya Line, which was closed in 1985.

Built in	Station		Mile	Connections	Note
1892	Muroran	室蘭	0.0		Muroran Port
1892	Misaki	御崎	2.2		
1892	Wanishi	輪西	2.9		Present-day Higashi-Muroran
1892	Washibetsu	鷲別	5.6		
1892	Horobetsu	幌別	10.3		
1892	Noboribetsu	登別	15.3		
1892	Shikifu	敷生	20.4		Present-day Takeura
1892	Shiraoi	白老	27.0		
1892	Nishitappu	錦多峰	34.3		Present-day Nishikioka
1892	Tomakomai	苫小牧	40.1		
1892	Numanohata	沼ノ端	45.9		
1892	Toasa	遠浅	51.4		
1892	Hayakita	早来	54.8		
1892	Abira	安平	58.3		
1892	Oiwake	追分	62.5	To Yūbari	
1892	Mikawa	三川	67.5		
1892	Yuni	由仁	72.3		
1892	Kuriyama	栗山	75.4		
1892	Kiyomappu	清真布	80.5		Present-day Kurisawa
1892	Shibun	志文	83.0		
1892	Iwamizawa	岩見沢	86.5	To Utashinai, Ikushunbetsu	
1882	Iwamizawa	岩見沢	86.5	To Utashinai, Ikushunbetsu	
1882	Horomui	幌向	92.9		
1882	Ebetsu	江別	98.7		
1882	Nopporo	野幌	100.6		
1882	Atsubetsu	厚別	105.4		
1882	Shiroishi	白石	108.2		
1882	Sapporo	札幌	111.7		
1880	Sapporo	札幌	111.7		
1880	Kotoni	琴似	114.2		
1880	Karugawa	軽川	118.4		Present-day Teine
1880	Zenibako	銭函	123.1		
1880	Hariusu	張碓	126.3		Station closed in 2006
1880	Asari	朝里	128.6		
1880	Otaru	小樽	131.9	Hokkaidō Railway to Hakodate	Present-day Minami-Otaru
1880	Temiya	手宮	133.6		Otaru Port. Station closed in 1985

==== Iwamizawa – Utashinai ====
The Iwamizawa–Sunagawa section is the part of the Hakodate Main Line today. The remaining part became the Utashinai Line, which was closed in 1988.

Built in	Station		Mile	Connections	Note
1881	Iwamizawa	岩見沢	0.0	To Muroran, Temiya, Ikushunbetsu	
1881	Minenobu	峰延	5.1		
1881	Bibai	美唄	10.4		
1881	Naie	奈井江	17.0		
1881	Sunagawa	砂川	21.9	To Asahigawa via Japanese Government Railways	
1881	Kamoi	神威	29.2		Station closed in 1988
1881	Utashinai	歌志内	30.8		Sorachi Mine. Station closed in 1988

==== Iwamizawa – Ikushunbetsu ====
This section later became a part of the Horonai Line, which was closed in 1987.

Built in	Station		Mile	Connections	Note
1882	Iwamizawa	岩見沢	0.0	To Otaru, Muroran, Utashinai	
1882	Horonaibuto	幌内太	6.7	To Horonai	Later renamed Mikasa, station closed in 1987
1888	Horonaibuto	幌内太	6.7	To Horonai	Later renamed Mikasa, station closed in 1987
1888	Ikushunbetsu	幾春別	11.2		Ikushunbetsu Mine. Station closed in 1987

==== Horonaibuto – Horonai ====
This section later became a part of the Horonai Line, which was closed in 1987.

Built in	Station		Mile	Connections	Note
1882	Horonaibuto	幌内太	0.0	To Iwamizawa, Ikushunbetsu	Later renamed Mikasa, station closed in 1987
1882	Horonai	幌内	1.7		Horonai Mine. Station closed in 1987

==== Oiwake – Yūbari ====
The section from Oiwake to Shin-Yubari (Momijiyama) is a part of the Sekishō Line (Main section) today while the remainder became the Yubari Branch Line which closed in 2019.

Built in	Station		Mile	Connections	Note
1892	Oiwake	追分	0.0	To Otaru, Muroran	
1892	Kawabata	川端	5.9		
1892	Takinoue	滝ノ上	11.3		
1892	Momijiyama	紅葉山	15.7		Present-day Shin-Yūbari
1892	Numanosawa	沼ノ沢	17.5		
1892	Shimizusawa	清水沢	20.9		
1892	Shikanotani	鹿ノ谷	25.1		
1892	Yūbari	夕張	27.2		Yūbari Mine

==== Sunagawa – Sorachigawa ====
The company leased this section to Japanese Government Railways. This section is a part of the Hakodate Main Line today.

Built in	Station		Mile	Connections	Note
1892	Sunagawa	砂川	0.0	To Iwamizawa, Utashinai	
1892	Sorachigawa	空知川	3.0		Only a divisional point of railway asset.

=== Nationalization ===
As the Railway Nationalization Act was promulgated, on October 1, 1906, the company's railway (207 miles 51 chains), rolling stock (1,940), steamship (1), personnel (3,673) and other goods and contracts were transferred to the government of Japan, in exchange of 30,997,100 yen worth of government bond.
