= Higashi-Oiwake Station =

Train station in Abira, Hokkaido, Japan

Coordinates: 42.9024°N 141.8325°E

Higashi-Oiwake Station 東追分駅
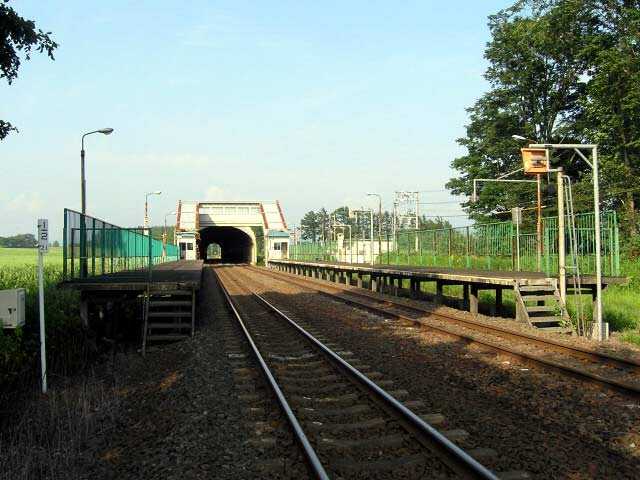
- Higashi-Oiwake Station in July 2004

General information
- Location: Abira, Yūfutsu District, Hokkaido; Japan
- Operator: Hokkaido Railway Company
- Line: ■ Sekisho Line
- Distance: 21.6 km from Minami-Chitose
- Platforms: 2 side platforms
- Tracks: 2

Other information
- Status: Closed
- Station code: K16

History
- Opened: 1 March 1965
- Closed: 25 March 2016
Location
- Location within Japan

Higashi-Oiwake Station (東追分駅, Higashi-Oiwake-eki) was a railway station on the Sekisho Line in Abira, Hokkaido, Japan, operated by Hokkaido Railway Company (JR Hokkaido). Opened in 1965, it closed in March 2016.

== Lines ==
Higashi-Oiwake Station was served by the Sekisho Line, and was situated 21.6 km from the starting point of the line at Minami-Chitose Station. The station was numbered "K16".

== Station layout ==
The station had two side platforms serving two tracks.

== Adjacent stations ==
«	Service	»
Sekisho Line
Oiwake	-	Kawabata

== History ==
The station opened on 1 March 1965. With the privatization of Japanese National Railways (JNR) on 1 April 1987, the station came under the control of JR Hokkaido.

=== February 2012 freight train derailment ===
At around 20:50 on 16 February 2012, a freight train derailed at the station after passing a signal at red and colliding with the wall of a snow shelter close to the station.

The up container freight train from Kushiro Freight Terminal to Sapporo Freight Terminal was normally scheduled to pass the station non-stop, but on this occasion faced a red signal to allow it to pass the delayed down Super Ōzora 13 service in the opposite direction. The driver reportedly applied the brakes, but the train failed to stop and was derailed by the catch points protecting the single-track line, hitting the wall of a snow shelter protecting the junction. The JR Freight Class DF200 diesel locomotive and four of the container wagons in the train were derailed, but the lone 25-year-old driver was uninjured. Six train services were cancelled as a result.

=== Closure ===
In September 2015, it was announced that JR Hokkaido planned to close this station in March 2016. The station closed following the last day of services on 25 March 2016.

== See also ==
- List of railway stations in Japan
