= Takinoue Signal Station =

Railway station in Yūbari, Hokkaido, Japan

Coordinates: 42.9102°N 141.9764°E

Takinoue Signal Station 滝ノ上信号場
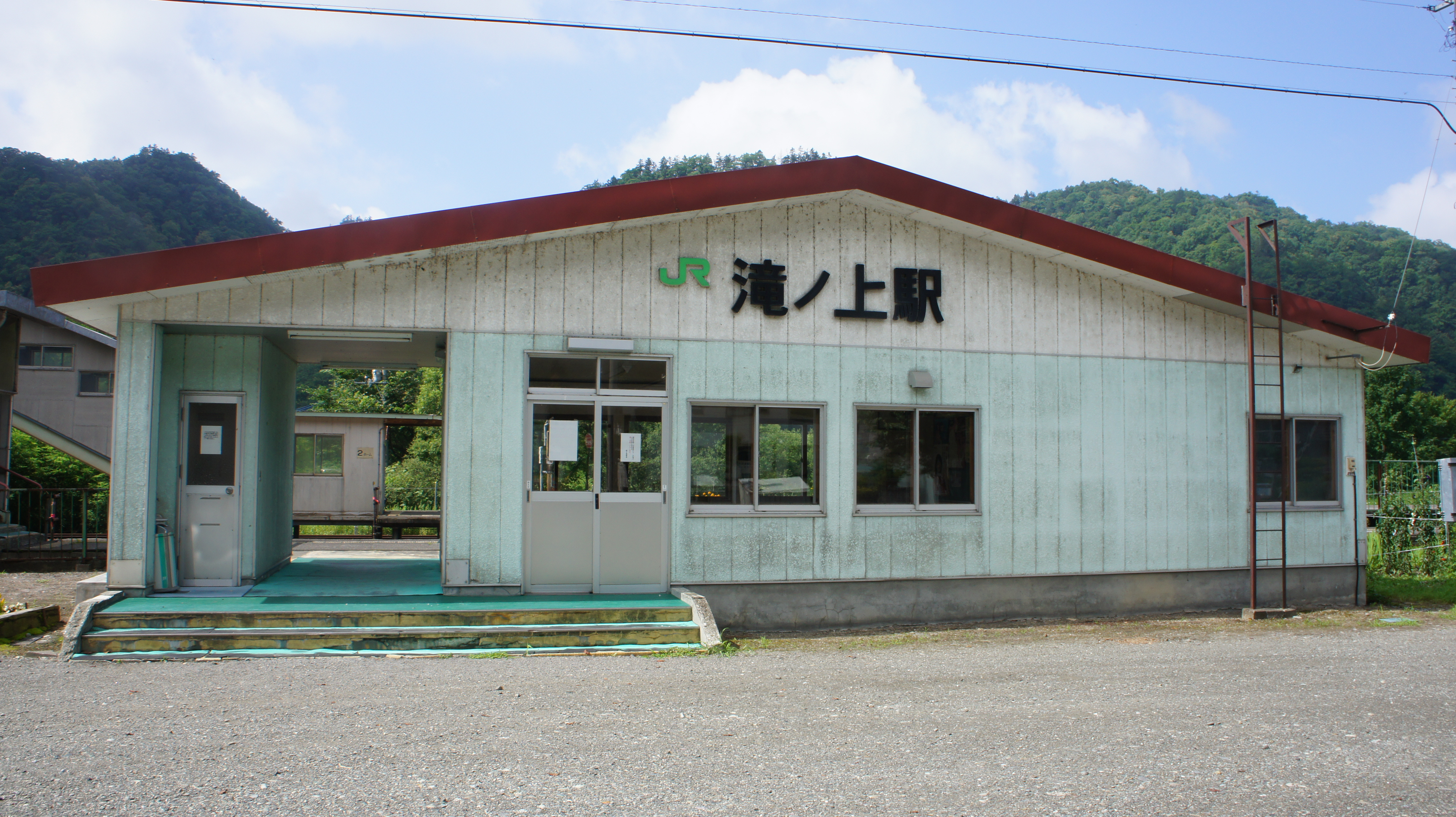
- Station building in July, 2017

General information
- Location: Yūbari, Hokkaido; Japan
- Operator: JR Hokkaido
- Line: Sekishō Line
- Distance: 35.8 km (22.2 mi) from Minami-Chitose
- Platforms: 2 side platforms
- Tracks: 2

Construction
- Structure type: At grade

Other information
- Status: Unstaffed
- Station code: K18

History
- Opened: 16 February 1897; 129 years ago
- Closed: 16 March 2024

Passengers
- FY2014: 6 daily

Services
Preceding station	JR Hokkaido	Following station
Kawabata towards Minami-Chitose	Sekishō Line	Shin-Yūbari towards Shintoku
Ōzora does not stop here
Tokachi does not stop here
Location
- Location within Hokkaido Location within Japan

Takinoue Signal Station (滝ノ上信号場, Takinoue-shingōjo) is a railway signal station on the Sekisho Line in Yūbari, Hokkaido, Japan, operated by Hokkaido Railway Company (JR Hokkaido). Until March 15, 2024, it operated as Takinoue Station for passengers.

== Lines ==
Takinoue Station was served by the Sekisho Line, and was situated 27.0 km from the starting point of the line at Minami-Chitose Station. The station is numbered "K18".

== Station layout ==
The station had one side platform and one island platform connected by a footbridge, serving three tracks. Kitaca was not available. The station was unattended.

== History ==
The station opened on 16 February 1897. With the privatization of Japanese National Railways (JNR) on 1 April 1987, the station came under the control of JR Hokkaido.

=== Closure ===
In June 2023, this station was selected to be among 42 stations on the JR Hokkaido network to be slated for abolition owing to low ridership. The last train served the station on 15 March 2024 and the station was officially closed the next day.

== See also ==
- List of railway stations in Japan
