= Sekishō Line =

Railway line in Hokkaido, Japan

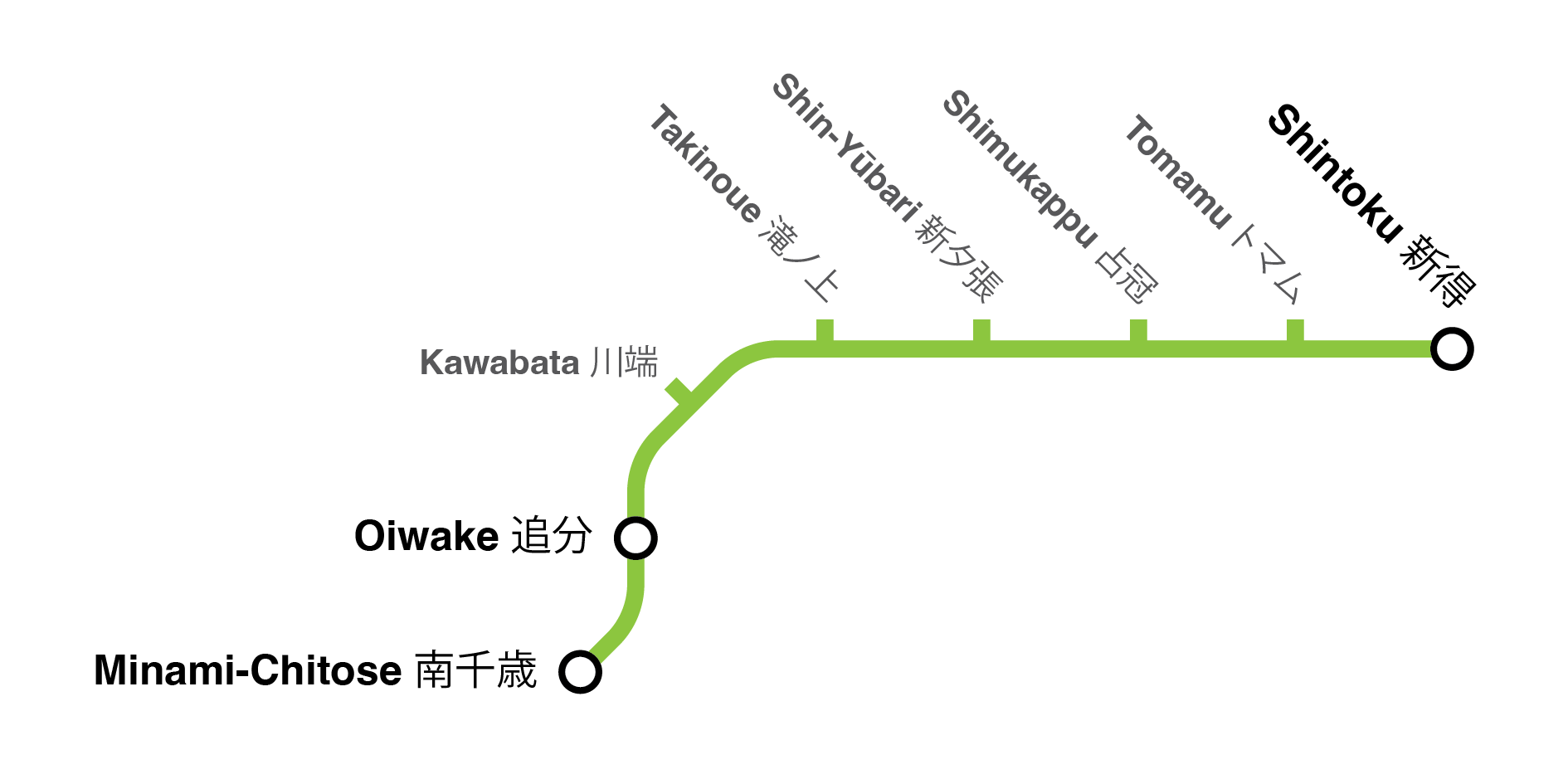
- Schematic map of the Sekishō Line including all stations

Overview
- Native name: 石勝線
- Status: In operation
- Owner: JR Hokkaido
- Locale: Hokkaido
- Termini: Minami-Chitose; Shintoku
- Stations: 7

Service
- Type: Heavy rail
- Operator(s): JR Hokkaido
- Rolling stock: KiHa 40 series DMU, KiHa 283 series DMU, KiHa 261 series DMU

History
- Opened: 1 November 1892; 133 years ago

Technical
- Line length: 132.4 km (82.3 mi)
- Number of tracks: Mostly single track with a few sections of double track
- Character: Rural
- Track gauge: 1,067 mm (3 ft 6 in)
- Electrification: None
- Operating speed: 120 km/h (75 mph)
Route map

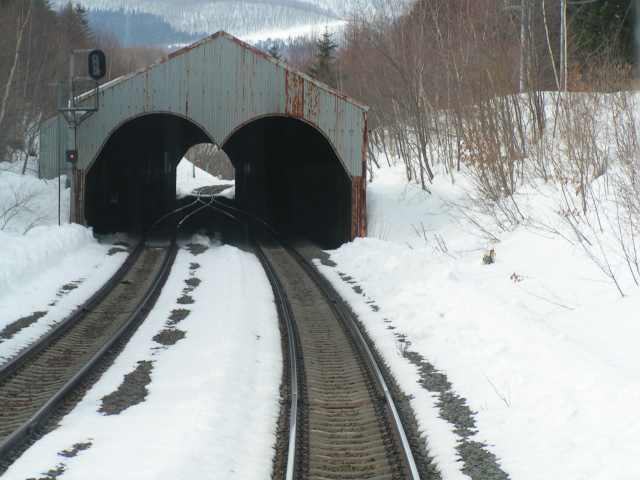
A snow shelter protecting railway switches from possible freezing, at Nishi-Shintoku Junction

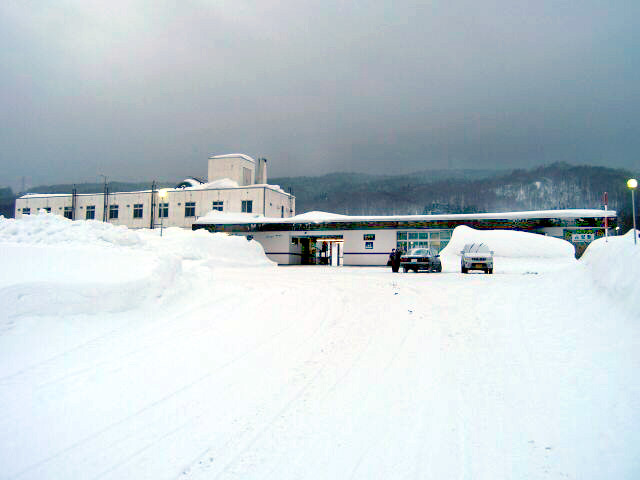
Shimukappu Station in snow

The Sekishō Line (石勝線, Sekishō-sen) is a railway line in Japan operated by Hokkaido Railway Company (JR Hokkaido). The main Sekishō Line connects Minami-Chitose in Chitose and Shintoku Station in the town of Shintoku. The name of the line comes from the subprefectures along the route, namely Ishikari (石狩) and Tokachi (十勝).

Outside and inside a local train on the Sekishō Line, 2021

== Basic data ==
- Distances
  - Main line, Minami-Chitose - Shintoku: 132.4 km
- Operators
  - Hokkaido Railway Company (category 1)
    - Minami-Chitose - Shintoku: 132.4 km
  - Japan Freight Railway Company (category 2)
    - Minami-Chitose - Kami-Ochiai Junction: 108.3 km
- Track: single
- Block system: Automatic

== Services ==
The line is a part of the main line between Sapporo and eastern Hokkaido. Ōzora limited express trains run between Sapporo and Kushiro 6 times a day, while Tokachi 5 times daily, both between Sapporo and Obihiro. The Marimo sleeping car service which formerly operated between Sapporo and Kushiro, was discontinued in 2008.

There are no local train services between Shin-Yūbari and Shintoku, since the line runs through rather sparsely populated areas. There is a local train service between Minami-Chitose and Shin-Yūbari, with one train approximately every 2 hours.

== Stations ==
=== Main Line ===
Station			Distance (km)	Transfers	Location
H14	Minami-Chitose	南千歳	0.0	■ Chitose Line ■ Chitose Line Airport Branch	Chitose
	Komasato Passing Loop	駒里(信)	5.4		Chitose
	Nishi-Hayakita Passing Loop	西早来(信)	11.7		Abira, Yūfutsu
K15	Oiwake	追分	17.6	■ Muroran Main Line	Abira, Yūfutsu
	Higashi-Oiwake Passing Loop	東追分(信)	21.6		Abira, Yūfutsu
K17	Kawabata	川端	27.0		Yuni, Yūbari
	Takinoshita Passing Loop	滝ノ下(信)	30.3		Kuriyama, Yūbari
	Takinoue Passing Loop	滝ノ上(信)	35.8		Yūbari
	Tomisato Passing Loop	十三里(信)	40.2		Yūbari
K20	Shin-Yūbari	新夕張	43.0		Yūbari
	Kaede Passing Loop	楓(信)	48.7		Yūbari
	Osawa Passing Loop	オサワ(信)	55.7		Mukawa, Yūfutsu
	Higashi-Osawa Passing Loop	東オサワ(信)	59.6		Mukawa, Yūfutsu
	Seifūzan Passing Loop	清風山(信)	67.3		Shimukappu, Yūfutsu
K21	Shimukappu	占冠	77.3		Shimukappu, Yūfutsu
	Higashi-Shimukappu Passing Loop	東占冠(信)	81.3		Shimukappu, Yūfutsu
	Takinosawa Signal Passing Loop	滝ノ沢(信)	85.7		Shimukappu, Yūfutsu
	Horoka Passing Loop	ホロカ(信)	92.6		Shimukappu, Yūfutsu
K22	Tomamu	トマム	98.6		Shimukappu, Yūfutsu
	Kushinai Passing Loop	串内(信)	104.2		Minamifurano, Sorachi
	Kami-Ochiai Junction	上落合(信)	108.3		Minamifurano, Sorachi
	Shin-Karikachi Passing Loop	新狩勝(信)	113.9		Shintoku, Kamikawa
	Hirouchi Passing Loop	広内(信)	120.1		Shintoku, Kamikawa
	Nishi-Shintoku Passing Loop	西新得(信)	125.6		Shintoku, Kamikawa
K23	Shintoku	新得	132.4	■■ Nemuro Main Line	Shintoku, Kamikawa

==== Closed stations ====
- K16 Higashi-Oiwake: Closed 25 March 2016
- K18 Takinoue: Closed 16 March 2024
- K19 Tomisato: Closed 25 March 2016

=== Yūbari Branch Line (closed in March 2019) ===
Station			Distance (km)	Transfers	Location
K20	Shin-Yūbari	新夕張	0.0	■ Sekishō Line (Main Line)	Yūbari
Y21	Numanosawa	沼ノ沢	2.7		Yūbari
Y22	Minami-Shimizusawa	南清水沢	6.7		Yūbari
Y23	Shimizusawa	清水沢	8.2		Yūbari
Y24	Shikanotani	鹿ノ谷	14.8		Yūbari
Y25	Yūbari	夕張	16.1		Yūbari

== Passing loops and junctions ==
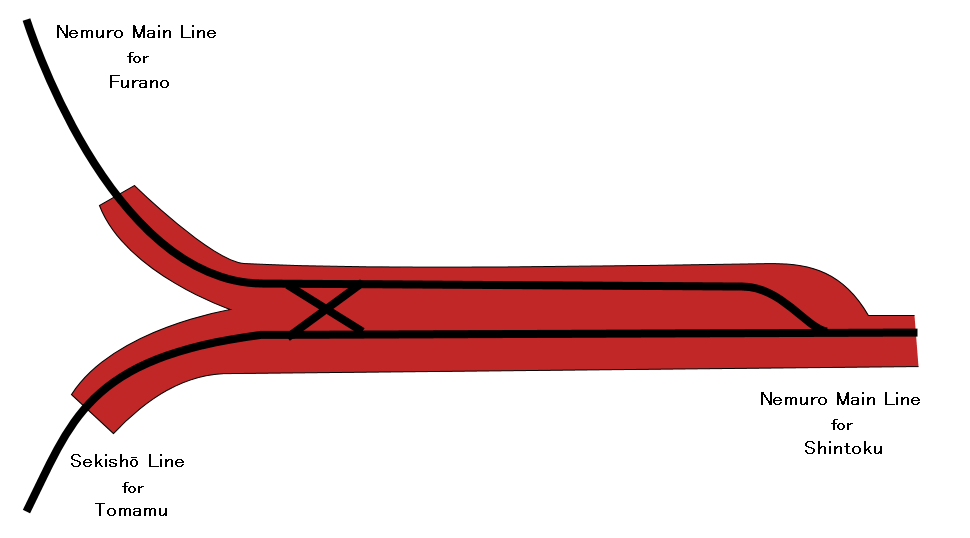
Diagram of Kami-Ochiai Junction (upper left) Nemuro Main Line (for Furano) (lower left) Sekishō Line (right) Nemuro Main Line for Obihiro and Kushiro Shin-Karikachi Tunnel in red

=== Kami-Ochiai Junction ===
43°6′8″N 142°41′31″E
Kami-Ochiai Junction (上落合信号場, Kami-Ochiai Shingōjō) is a junction in Minamifurano, Sorachi. This junction is located in Shin-Karikachi Tunnel (新狩勝トンネル) (near the western mouth).

=== Passing Loops between Minami-Chitose and Kami-Ochiai Junction ===
==== Komasato Passing Loop ====
42°48′13″N 141°44′04″E
Komasato Passing Loop (駒里信号場, Komasato Shingōjō) is a passing loop in Chitose, Hokkaidō with two tracks and two snow shelters.

==== Nishi-Hayakita Passing Loop ====
42°49′28″N 141°48′18″E
Nishi-Hayakita Passing Loop (西早来信号場, Nishi-Hayakita Shingōjō) is a passing loop in Abira, Hokkaidō with two tracks and two snow shelters (one of them is connected to a tunnel).

==== Takinoshita Passing Loop ====
42°54′26″N 141°55′20″E
Takinoshita Passing Loop (滝ノ下信号場, Takinoshita Shingōjō) is a passing loop in Kuriyama, Hokkaidō with two tracks and two snow shelters.

==== Kaede Passing Loop ====
42°55′54″N 142°05′30″E
Kaede Passing Loop (楓信号場, Kaede Shingōjō) is a passing loop in Yūbari, Hokkaidō with two tracks and two snow shelters. It was Kaede Station before 12 March 1994.

==== Osawa Passing Loop ====
42°56′01″N 142°10′34″E
Osawa Passing Loop (オサワ信号場, Osawa Shingōjō) is a passing loop in Mukawa, Hokkaidō with two tracks and two snow shelters.

==== Higashi-Osawa Passing Loop ====
42°56′37″N 142°13′10″E
Higashi-Osawa Passing Loop (東オサワ信号場, Higashi-Osawa Shingōjō) is a passing loop in Mukawa with two tracks and two snow shelters.

==== Seifūzan Passing Loop ====
42°57′00″N 142°18′29″E
Seifūzan Passing Loop (清風山信号場, Seifūzan Shingōjō) is a passing loop in Shimukappu, Hokkaidō with two tracks and two snow shelters.

==== Onitōge Passing Loop ====
42°58′25″N 142°20′25″E
Onitōge Passing Loop (鬼峠信号場, Onitōge Shingōjō) was a passing loop in Shimukappu with two tracks. It was located in Onitōge tunnel and taken out of service from 3 March 1986.

==== Higashi-Shimukappu Passing Loop ====
43°01′05″N 142°26′00″E
Higashi-Shimukappu Passing Loop (東占冠信号場, Higashi-Shimukappu Shingōjō) is a passing loop in Shimukappu with two tracks and two snow shelters.

==== Takinosawa Passing Loop ====
43°02′41″N 142°28′14″E
Takinosawa Passing Loop (滝ノ沢信号場, Takinosawa Shingōjō) is a passing loop in Shimukappu with two tracks and two snow shelters.

==== Horoka Passing Loop ====
43°03′59″N 142°32′37″E
Horoka Passing Loop (ホロカ信号場, Horoka Shingōjō) is a passing loop in Shimukappu with two tracks and two snow shelters. It was completed in 1981 as Tomamu Passing Loop, but was renamed in 1987 to avoid confusion with Tomamu Station.

==== Kushinai Passing Loop ====
43°04′25″N 142°40′22″E
Kushinai Passing Loop (串内信号場, Kushinai Shingōjō) is a passing loop in Minamifurano, Hokkaidō with three tracks and two snow shelters. The center track is bidirectional.

=== Passing Loops between Kami-Ochiai Junction and Shintoku ===
There are three passing loops shared by the Sekishō Line and Nemuro Main Line between Kami-Ochiai Junction and Shintoku Station.

==== Shin-Karikachi Passing Loop ====
43°06′07″N 142°45′48″E
Shin-Karikachi Passing Loop (新狩勝信号場, Shin-Karikachi Shingōjō) is a passing loop in Shintoku, Hokkaidō with two tracks and two snow shelters. The loop is located next to the eastern mouth of 5,790 m long Shin-Karikachi tunnel.

==== Hirouchi Passing Loop ====
43°03′14″N 142°47′31″E
Hirouchi Passing Loop (広内信号場, Hirouchi Shingōjō) is a passing loop in Shintoku, Hokkaidō with three tracks and two snow shelters. The west track is used for siding for both up and down.

==== Nishi-Shintoku Passing Loop ====
43°04′51″N 142°47′48″E
Nishi-Shintoku Passing Loop (西新得信号場, Nishi-Shintoku Shingōjō) is a passing loop in Shintoku, Hokkaidō with two tracks and two snow shelters.

== History ==
In 1892, the Hokkaido Colliery and Railway Company opened the Yūbari Line (夕張線, Yūbari-sen) from Oiwake to Yūbari for transporting coal to the Port of Muroran via the Muroran Main Line.

In 1906, the Japanese Government nationalised the company, and double-tracked the line between 1912 and 1919. However, the line was single-tracked in 1932. The abandoned western tunnel north of Shimizusawa, and significant portions of the second line formation are still visible.

The Minami-Chitose - Oiwake and Shin-Yūbari - Kami-Ochiai Junction (on the Nemuro Main Line) sections opened in 1981, becoming the two ends of the Sekishō Line. The Yūbari Line was renamed in two sections, the section between Oiwake and Shin-Yūbari becoming the mid section of the Sekishō Line, and the section between Shin-Yūbari and Yūbari becoming the Yūbari Branch Line of the Sekishō Line. The new line shortened the main route to eastern Hokkaido. Previously, passengers to Shintoku and further east had to travel via the Nemuro Main Line.

In 1985 the Yūbari station was relocated 1.3 km south of its original location, and it was moved another 800 m south in 1990.

=== Closure of Yūbari Branch Line ===
On 17 August 2016, JR Hokkaido announced the Yūbari Branch Line from Shin-Yūbari to Yūbari would close. The branch line closed on 31 March 2019.

=== Line disruptions ===
On 25 August 2016, torrential rain from Typhoon Mindulle caused erosion at Horoka passing loop, closing the Shin-Yūbari - Shintoku section until 29 August. However, on 31 August further torrential rain from Typhoon Lionrock caused further erosion at Tomamu, closing the section again until 1 October.

=== Former connecting lines ===
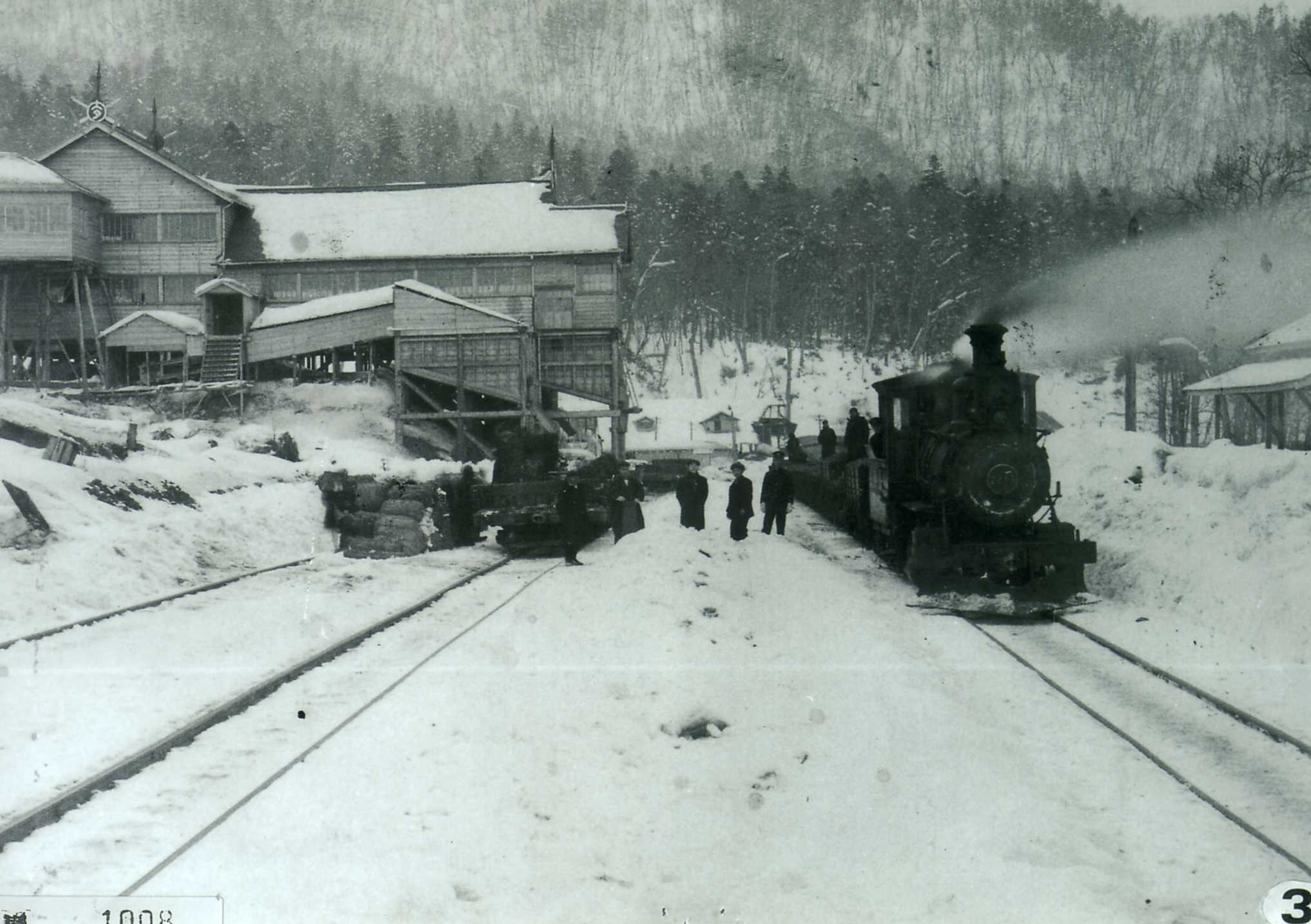
Yūbari coalmine, 1912

- Shin-Yūbari station - In 1916, a 7.6 km branch opened from Momijiyama (later Shin-Yūbari) to Noborikawa, approximately on the same alignment as the later Shin-Yūbari - Kami-Ochiai Junction line. It closed in 1980.

Three separate private railways connected to the Yūbari line:

- Numanosawa station - The 4.4 km line to the Hokutan Mayachi coal mine operated from 1913 until the closure of the mine in 1987.
- Shimizusawa station - The Mitsubishi Yūbari line opened to South Yūbari (7.6 km) in 1911, and extended 9.6 km to Sumiyawa in 1929. The Sumiyawa section closed in 1973, and the original 7.6 km section closed in 1987.
- Yūbari station - The Hokkaido Colliery and Steamship Co. built a 34 km line from Kuriyama on the Muroran Main Line (including a bridge over that line) to Yūbari in 1926, including a switch-back (or zig-zag) section at Nishikisawa. A 23 km extension opened from Kuriyama - Nopporo (on the Hakodate Main Line 18 km east of Sapporo) in 1930. At its peak in 1965, the line carried 1.5 million tonnes of coal and another 0.5 million tonnes of general freight annually, as well as 2 million passengers. The entire line closed in 1975 after the closure of the mine in 1972. A 4.7 km branch to the Tsunoda mine operated from 1927 until 1970.

=== Accidents ===
==== 2011 Super Ōzora derailment and fire ====
On 27 May 2011, the Super Ōzora 14 service from Kushiro to Sapporo was brought to an emergency stop inside the 685 metre-long No. 1 Niniu Tunnel in Shimukappu, Hokkaidō, at around 21:55 after car number 2 of the 6-car formation became derailed. The train caught fire, and all of the 245 people on board, including train staff eventually evacuated the train. 39 were treated for smoke inhalation and minor burn injuries. The burnt-out train was removed from the tunnel on 29 May 2011.

==== 2012 Higashi-Oiwake Station derailment ====
At around 20:50 on 16 February 2012, a freight train derailed at Higashi-Oiwake Station after passing a signal at red and colliding with the wall of a snow shelter adjacent to the station.

The up container freight train from Kushiro Freight Terminal to Sapporo Freight Terminal was normally scheduled to pass Higashi-Oiwake Station non-stop, but on this occasion faced a red signal to allow the delayed down Super Ōzora 13 service to pass in the opposite direction. The driver reportedly applied the brakes, but the train failed to stop and was derailed by the catch points protecting the single-track line, hitting the wall of a snow shelter protecting the junction. The JR Freight Class DF200 diesel locomotive and four of the container wagons in the train were derailed, but the lone 25-year-old driver was uninjured. Six train services were cancelled as a result.

== See also ==
- List of railway lines in Japan
