= Abira, Hokkaido =

Abira 安平町
- Town
- Flag Emblem

- Location of Abira in Hokkaido (Iburi Subprefecture)

- Location in Japan
- Coordinates: 42°46′N 141°49′E
- Country: Japan
- Region: Hokkaido
- Prefecture: Hokkaido (Iburi Subprefecture)
- District: Yūfutsu (Iburi)

Area
  - Total: 237.13 km^{2} (91.56 sq mi)

Population (30 September 2016)
  - Total: 8,323
  - Density: 35.10/km^{2} (90.91/sq mi)
- Time zone: UTC+09:00 (JST)
- Website: www.town.abira.lg.jp

Abira (安平町, Abira-chō) is a town located in Iburi Subprefecture, Hokkaido, Japan. As of 30 September 2016, the town has an estimated population of 8,323.

== Geography ==
Located in the north-east of Iburi Subprefecture, and is a hilly area extending from the Yufutsu Plain to the Yūbari Mountains and the Maoi Hills. Abira is surrounded by Tomakomai in the south-west, Chitose in the north-west, Yuni in from the north to the east, and Atsuma in the south-east. The Toasa River flows through Abira and Tomakomai, and Abira River flows through the center of Abira.

The Pacific Ocean is close to the southern areas of Abira. So those areas' weather is mild year-round because of the oceanic climate. The northern areas have an inland climate, so the temperatures are high in the summer and a harsh cold in the winter. All together, the yearly snowfall is low.

- Mountains: Kumanoatama Yama (155m), Shiabiranupuri (364m)
- Rivers: Abira River
- Bodies of water: Mizuho Reservoir

=== Neighboring municipalities ===
- Iburi Subprefecture: Tomakomai, Atsuma
- Ishikari Subprefecture: Chitose
- Sorachi Subprefecture: Yuni

== Etymology ==
The name "Abira" comes from the Ainu language. However, there are various opinions as to what Ainu words does it come from. Possible words include:

- "ar-pira-pet" (pronounced arapirape in Japanese) [meaning the surface of a cliff's river]
- "ar-pira" (pronounced arapira in Japanese) [one side of a cliff]

== History ==
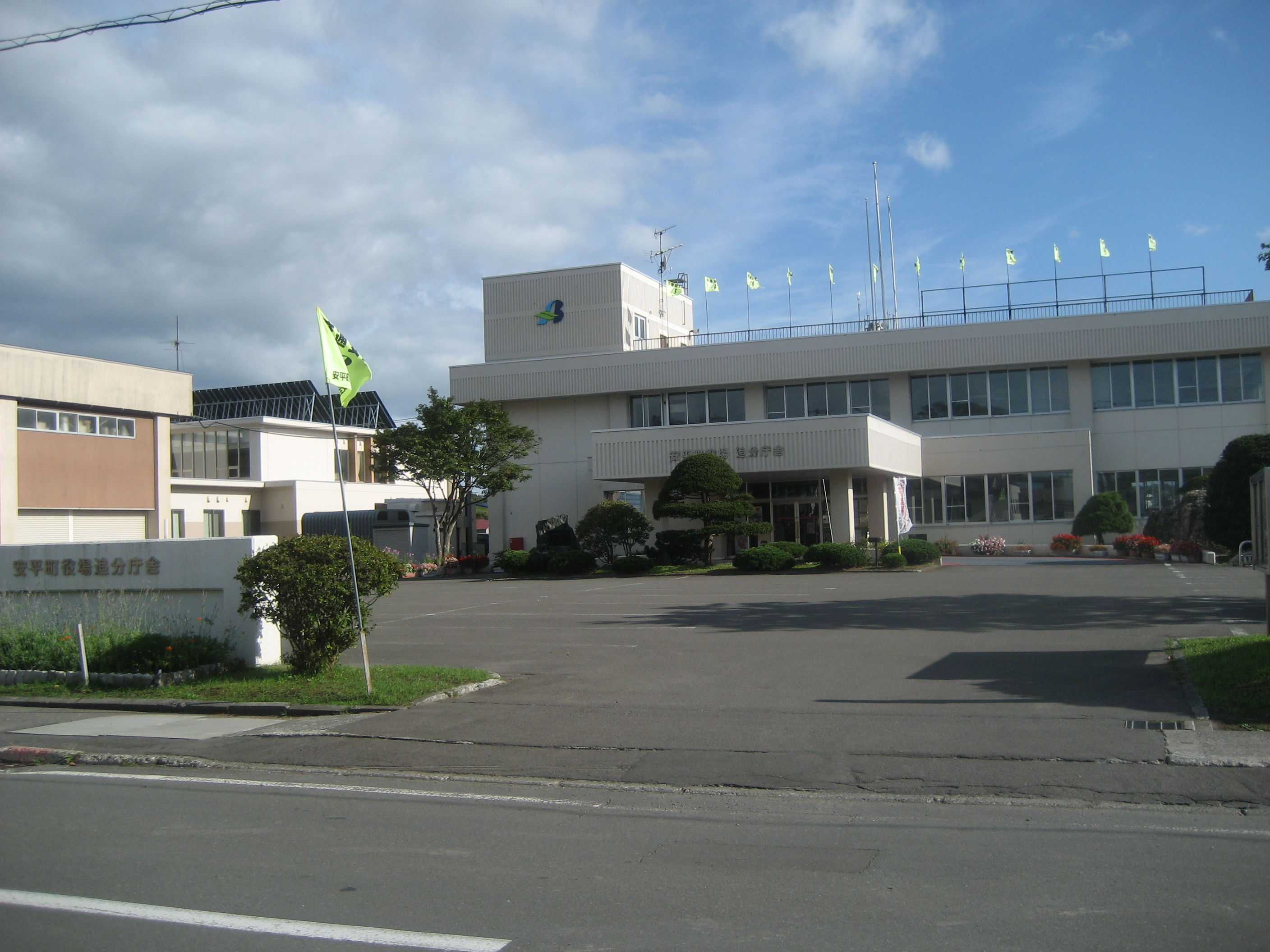
Abira Town Hall, previously Oiwake Town Hall

- 1900 (33rd year of the Meiji Era): Abira's own government office is established.
- 1902 (Meiji 35): Shika Park is opened.
- 1908 (Meiji 41): The village of Abira received a 2nd grade town/village rating from the Japanese government.
- 1923 (12th year of the Taishō Era): Abira received a 1st grade town/village rating.
- 1952 (27th year of the Shōwa Era): The village of Oiwake separated from the village of Abira.
- 1953 (Shōwa 28): The village of Oiwake became a town.
- 1954 (Shōwa 29): The village of Abira changed its name to Hayakita.
- 1957 (Shōwa 32): The village of Hayakita became a town.
- 1994 (6th year of the Heisei Era): Northern Farm, a horse-breeding ranch, was opened.
- 2006 (Heisei 18): The towns of Hayakita and Oiwake merged and became the town of Abira.
- 2018 (Heisei 30): The 2018 Hokkaido Eastern Iburi earthquake occurred. Abira experienced a JMA seismic intensity of 6 higher.。

== Demographics ==
Per Japanese census data, the population of Abira has declined in recent decades.

Historical population
Year	Pop.	±%
2000	9,438	—
2010	8,726	−7.5%
2020	7,340	−15.9%

Comparison of Population Distribution between Abira and Japanese National Average	Population Distribution by Age and Sex in Abira
■ Abira ■ Japan (average)	■ Male ■ Female
2015 Census, Ministry of Internal Affairs and Communications - Statistics Department

== Economy ==
=== Industry ===
Agriculture is the main industry for Abira. Abira's Toasa area is especially famous for its breeding of dairy cattle, which are then sent all over Japan. Another specialty is cantaloupe. Asahi Melon is a well known brand from the area.

Horse breeding is also a thriving industry in Abira, such as Yoshida Bokujo (Yoshida Ranch) in the Hayakita-Tomioka area and Northern Farm in the Hayakita-genbu area. The local horse breeding industry actively participates in the JRA Central Horse Racing. Many offsprings of famous stallions, such as Marzensky and 2005's Japanese Triple Crown of Thoroughbred Racing winner Deep Impact, are bred here.

- New Chitose Airport and Tomakomai's eastern industrial area are close to Abira, so it is also active in attracting industry.
- There are many golf courses.
- Since 1986, has been selling a Snowman Packaging through the Japan Post Service.

=== Local Companies ===
- The Hokkaido factory of Iris Ohyama
- SoftBank Tomatoh Abira Solar Park
- The Hayakita factory for Saveur Ss Inc (previously the Hokkaido factory for Snow Brand Foods).

=== Agricultural cooperative ===
- The Hayakita branch and Oiwake branch of the Tomakomai wide-area of the Japan Agricultural Cooperatives.

=== Post Offices ===
- Abira Post Office
- Hayakita-Yukidaruma Post Office
- Oiwake Post Office
- Toasa Post Office
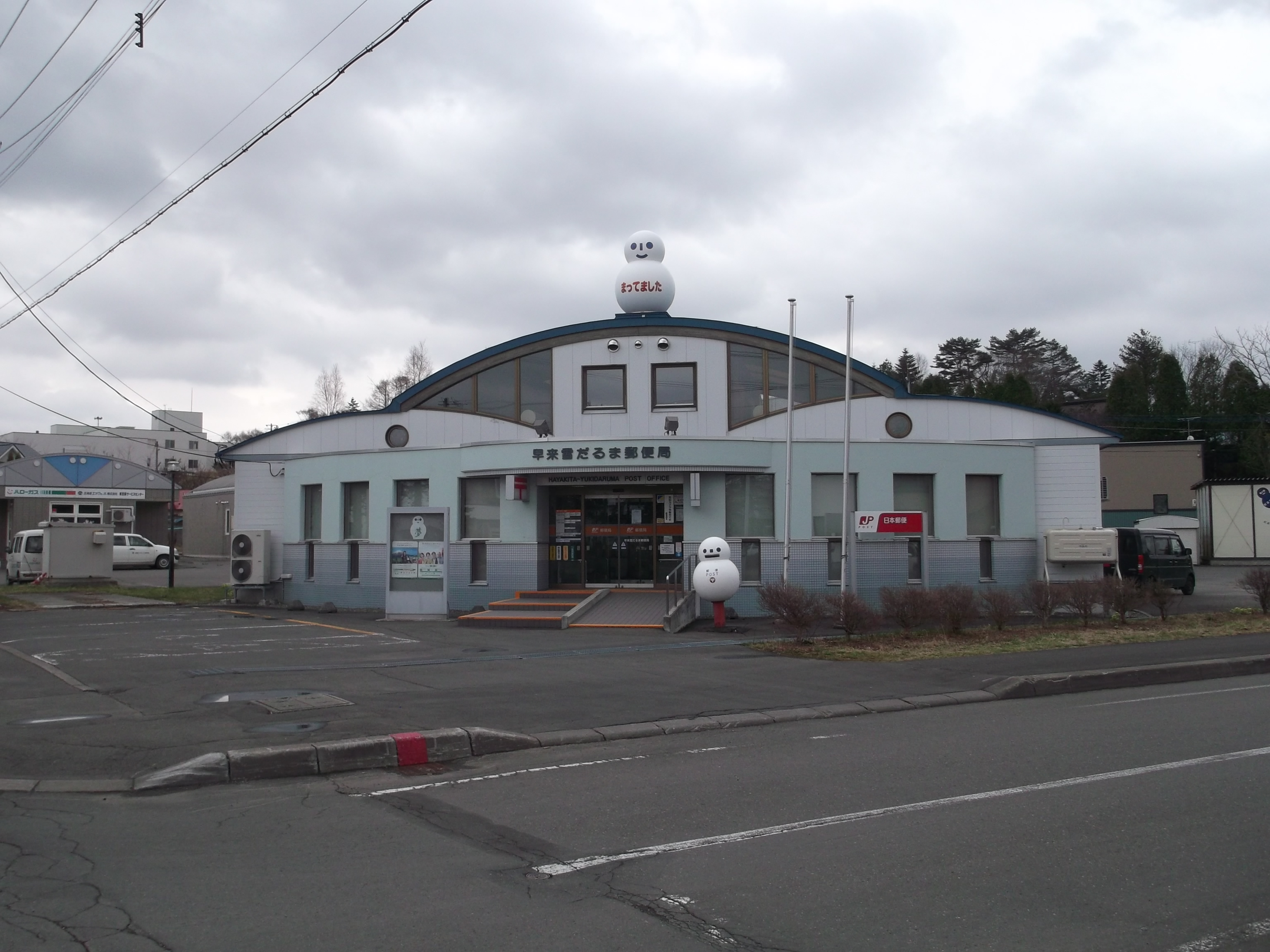
Hayakita-Yukidaruma Post Office

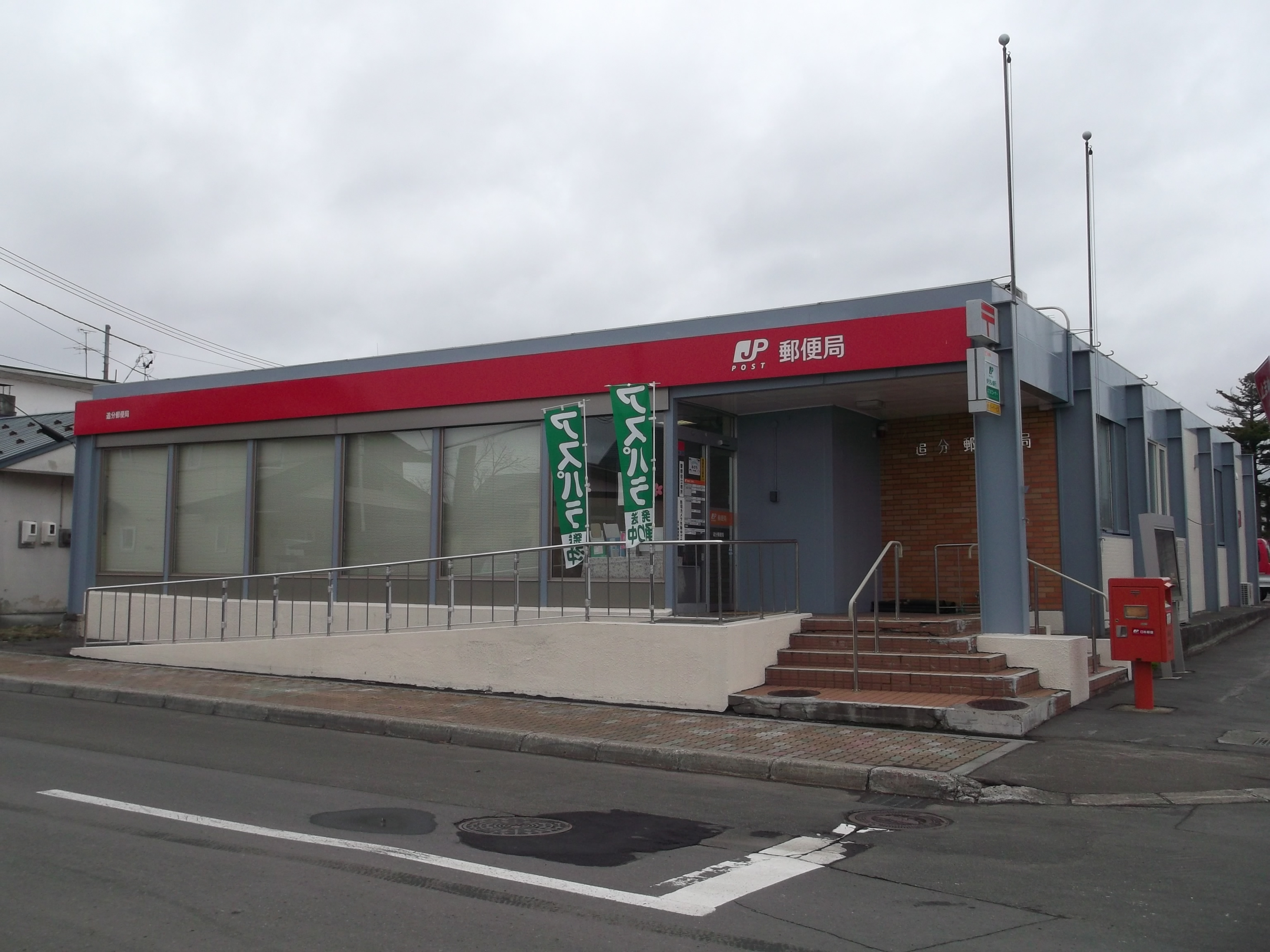
Oiwake Post Office

=== Financial institutions ===
- Hokkaido Bank Hayakita Branch, Oiwake Branch
- Hokuo Credit Union Hayakita Branch
- Credit Federation of Agricultural Cooperatives AKA JA Hokkaido Shinren AKA Shinren, JA Tomakomai Area Hayakita Branch and Oiwake Branch.

== Public institutions ==
=== Police Department ===
- Tomakomai Police's Hayakita Police Box

=== Fire Department ===
- East Iburi Firefighters Union – Abira Substation Fire Department
  - Oiwake Branch Fire Department

== Region ==
=== Schools ===
- High Schools
  - Oiwake High School (Established by Hokkaido Prefecture)
- Junior High Schools
  - Oiwake Junior High School (Established by the town of Abira)
  - Hayakita Junior High School (Established by the town of Abira)
- Elementary School
  - Oiwake Elementary School (Established by the town of Abira)
- Other
  - Hayakita Gakuen, Elementary and Junior High school combined (Established by the town of Abira)

=== Area broadcasting ===
Abira obtained a general terrestrial broadcast station license and now broadcasts Abira Channel in the local area.

== Transportation ==
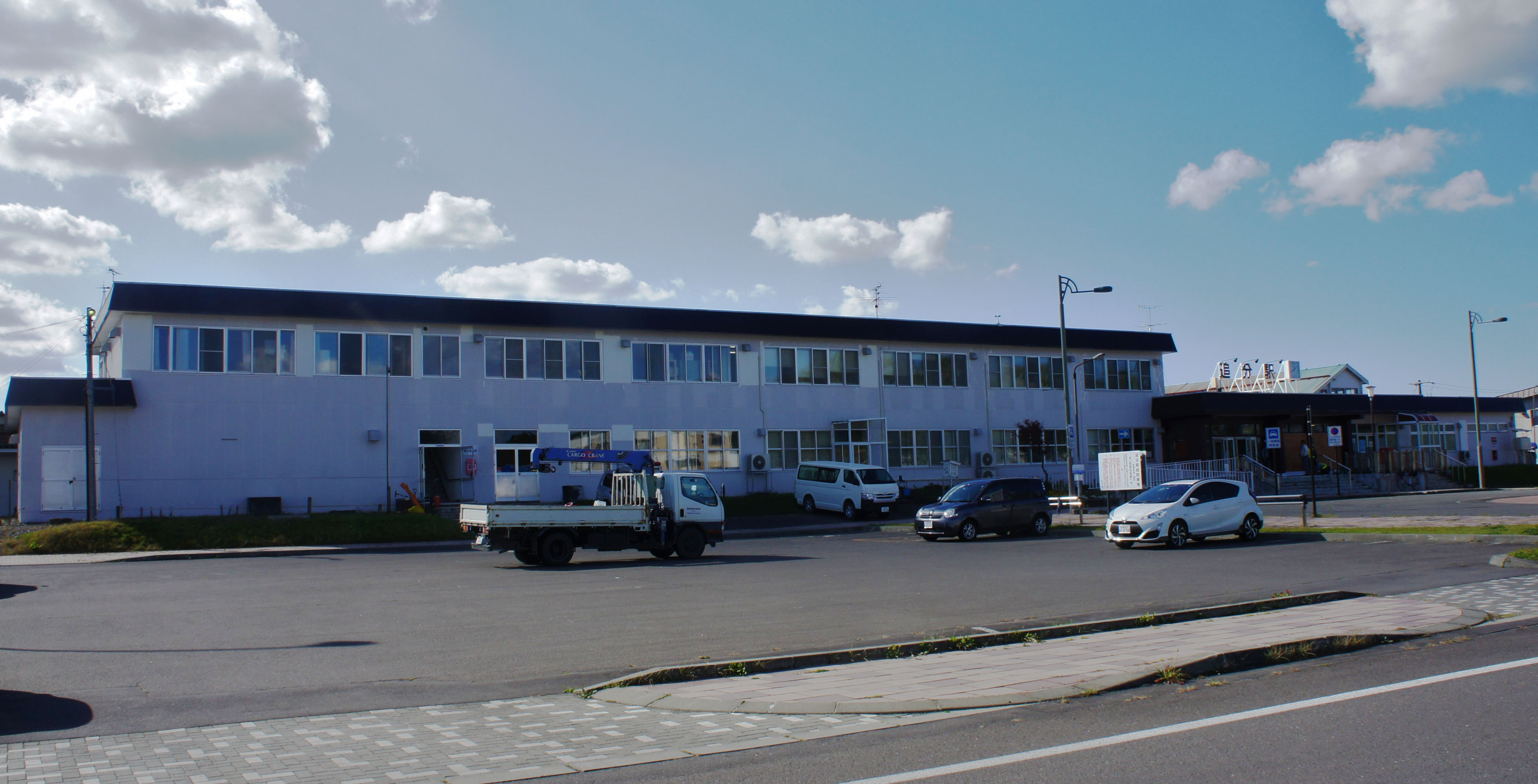
Oiwake Station

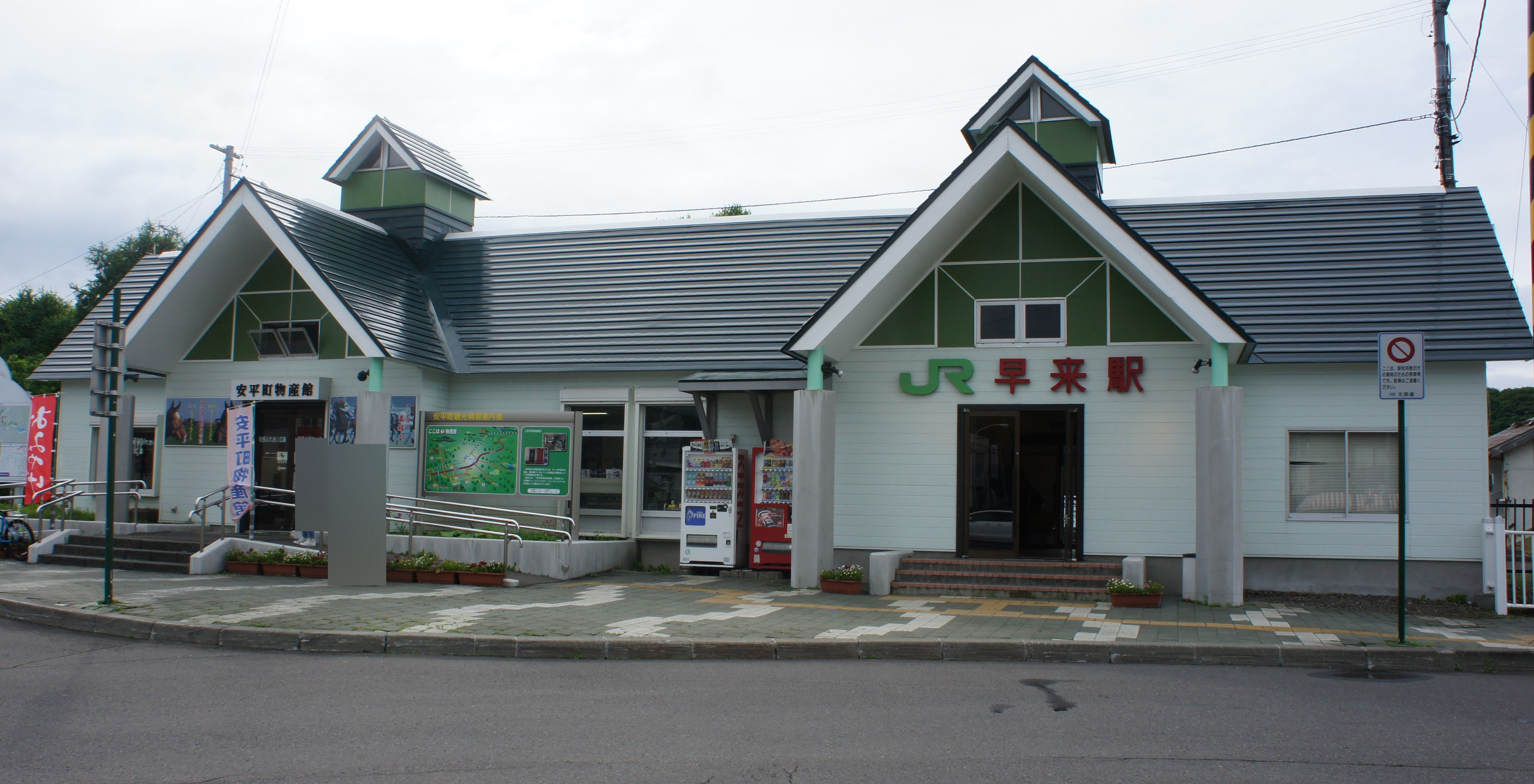
Oiwake Station

=== Airport ===
- New Chitose Airport (Chitose) is near.

=== Rail transport ===
- Hokkaido Railway Company (JR Hokkaido)
  - Muroran Main Line: Toasa Station – Hayakita Station – Abira Station – Oiwake Station
  - Sekishō Line: Oiwake Station – (Higashi-Oiwake Signal Station)

At one time, a company called Hayakita Railway (now known as Atsuma Bus) had a train line from Hayakita Station to Atsuma.

=== Roads and highways ===
- Controlled-access highway
  - Dōtō Expressway: Oiwake Interchange
- National Highway
  - National Route 234
- Prefectural road
  - Hokkaido Prefectural Road 10 Chitose Mukawa Route
  - Hokkaido Prefectural Road 226 Maizuru Oiwake Route
  - Hokkaido Prefectural Road 235 Kamihoronai Hayakita Depot Route
  - Hokkaido Prefectural Road 258 Hayakita Chitose Route
  - Hokkaido Prefectural Road 290 Oiwake Depot Route
  - Hokkaido Prefectural Road 462 Kawabata Oiwake Route
  - Hokkaido Prefectural Road 482 Togawa Toasa Depot Route
  - Hokkaido Prefectural Road 576 Zuiho Abira Depot Route
  - Hokkaido Prefectural Road 933 Hokushin Hiratori Route

== Attractions ==
=== Designated Cultural Assets ===
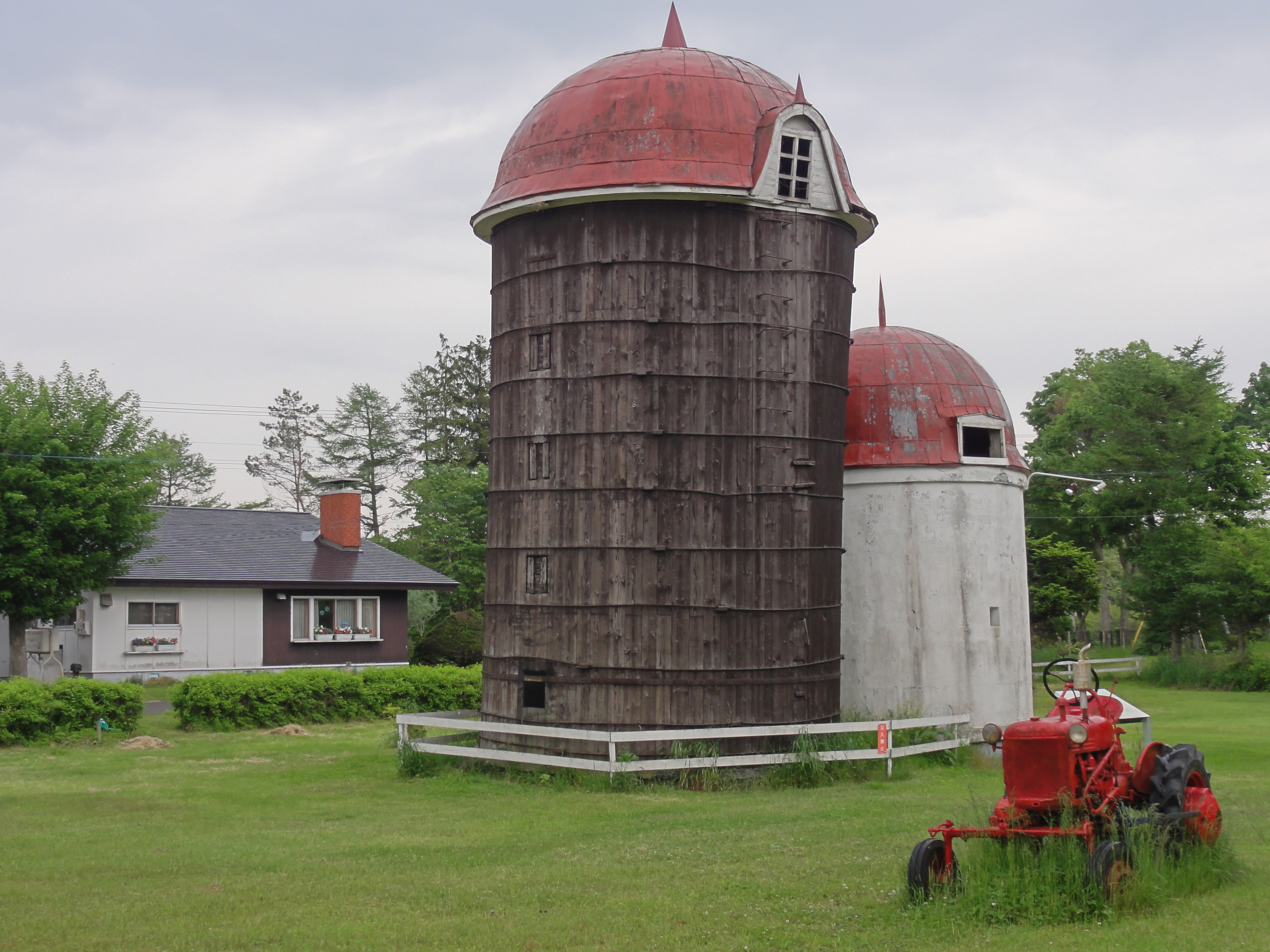
The oldest wooden silo in Japan（torn down in 2015）

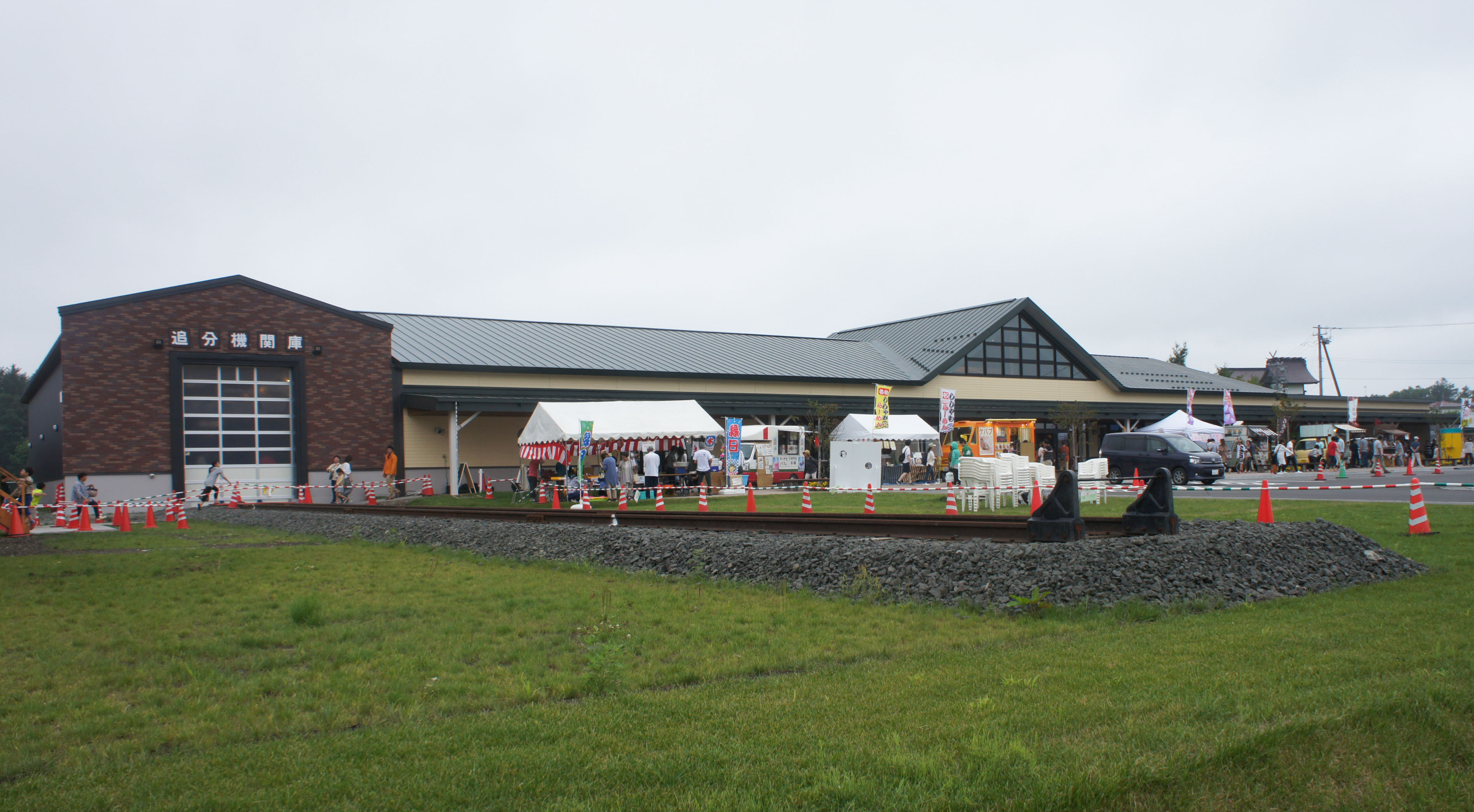
Abira Roadside Station D51

Source: List of Designated Municipal Cultural Properties in Hokkaido

- Wooden Silo – At risk of collapse due to aging, its Cultural Asset designation was removed and it was torn down.
- Within the "Abira Roadside Station D51":
  - JNR Class D51-320 steam locomotive – Railroad Museum
  - JNR Class D51-241 steam locomotive number plate – Railroad Museum
  - 1890s railroad track rail – Railroad Museum
- Small fire truck from 1955 – Abira Fire Department Substation Oiwake Branch
- Manuel firefighting pump – Abira Fire Department Substation Oiwake Branch
- Fire alarm bell from 1915 – Abira Fire Department Substation Oiwake Branch
- 2 stone storehouses
- The remains of the Yufutsu Electric Company
- Settlers Monument (Located at the place where Hayakita was founded) – Hayakitatomioka
- Location of the town's first rice paddy (monument) – Abira
- Settlers Monument – Hayakitamizuho
- Settlers Monument – Hayakitamidorioka
- Hayakita Junior High School Monument – Hayakitahokushin
- The resting place of renowned race horse Ten Point (Monument)
- Japan's first cheese factory (Monument)
- Irrigation Ditch Monument
- Myoshuhen Irrigation Ditch Monument
- Location of Abira's first school – 1893 (Meiji 26). Taught by town volunteers and based on the Terakoya system.
- Location of Abira's first school building
- Hokkaido Colliery and Railway Company's cokeyard (former coke factory)
- Former location of the Oiwake Rail yard
- First forest in Japan protected under the designation of health and safety forest. (Encompasses Abira's Shika Park)
- The location of Abira's first post office – 1896 (Meiji 29), was established near the current JP Oiwake branch post office.
- Large elm tree – owned by Oiwake Farm
- Site of the former Fuji Brewing Company

=== Sightseeing spots ===
- Abira Shika Park
- Seiko Dome – An athletics institute that was made to honor the activities of Seiko Hashimoto.
- Tsuru no Yu Onsen
- Railroad Museum – closed for winter from November to April
- Mizuho Dam

=== Famous people ===
- Seiko Hashimoto – Former speed skater and a current member of the House of Councillors (b. 1964)
