= SoftBank Tomatoh Abira Solar Park =

Solar plant in Abira, Hokkaido

- Country: Japan
- Location: Abira, Hokkaido; Japan
- Coordinates: 42.7197°N 141.7947°E
- Status: Operational
- Construction began: 7 October 2013
- Commission date: 6 December 2015
- Owner: Tomatoh Abira Solar Park

Solar farm
- Type: Standard PV
- Collectors: 444,024 panels
- Site area: 166 hectares

Power generation
- Nameplate capacity: 111 MW

SoftBank Tomatoh Abira Solar Park (ソフトバンク苫東安平ソーラーパーク) is a solar power generating station in Abira, Hokkaido, Japan. It has a capacity of about 111 MW, making it the third-largest operational solar plant in Japan.

== History ==
Commencement of construction was marked with a groundbreaking ceremony held on 7 October 2013. Construction and engineering services were carried out by Toshiba. The plant began operation on 6 December 2015.

== Facilities ==
The power plant comprises 444,024 monocrystalline silicon solar panels, and occupies a site of about 166 hectares.

The total capacity of the plant is 111 MW. Of this, 79 MW is supplied to the power grid.

== Ownership and operations ==
The plant is run by Tomatoh Abira Solar Park, a joint venture between SB Energy and Mitsui & Co. The land is rented from Tomatoh Inc.

== See also ==
- List of power stations in Japan
- Solar power in Japan
