= Shimukappu Station =

Railway station in Shimukappu, Hokkaido, Japan

Coordinates: 42°59′34.7″N 142°24′0.3″E

Shimukappu Station 占冠駅
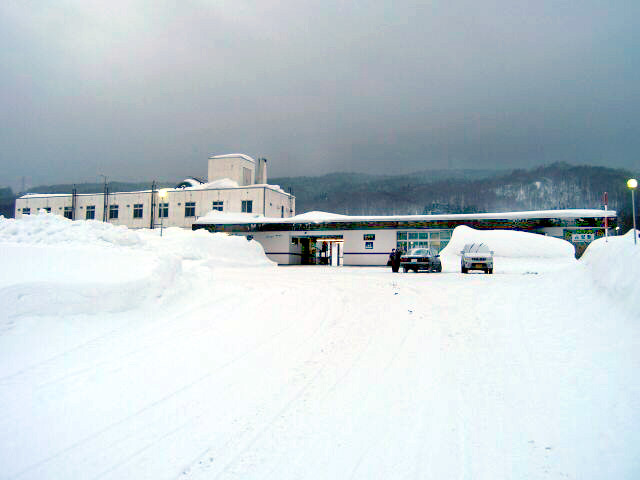
- Shimukappu Station in the snow.

General information
- Operator: JR Hokkaido
- Line: Sekishō Line
- Platforms: 1 side and 1 island platforms
- Tracks: 3

Other information
- Station code: K21

History
- Opened: 1 October 1981; 45 years ago

Services
| Preceding station | JR Hokkaido | Following station |
|---|---|---|
| Shin-Yūbari towards Minami-Chitose | Sekishō Line | Tomamu towards Shintoku |
Location
- Location within Hokkaido Location within Japan

Shimukappu Station (占冠駅, Shimukappu-eki) is a railway station on the JR Hokkaido Sekishō Line. It is located in Shimukappu, Hokkaidō, Japan. The station code is K21.

== Station structure ==
- 2-way, 3-track, above-ground station.

Platforms

| 1 | ■Sekishō Line | For Minami-Chitose and Sapporo |
| 2 | ■Sekishō Line | For Obihiro and Kushiro |
| 3 | ■Sekishō Line | (siding) |

- Shimukappu is a simple consignment station, administered by Shin-Yūbari Station. Ordinary tickets, express tickets, and reserved-seat tickets for all JR lines are on sale.
  - Business hours: 7:25 a.m. - 3:25 p.m.

== Adjacent stations ==
Hokkaido Railway Company
Sekishō Line

Shin-Yūbari Station - (Kaede Signal Ground) - (Osawa Signal Ground) - (Higashi-Osawa Signal Ground) - (Seifūzan Signal Ground) - (~~Oni-Tōge Signal Ground~~) - Shimukappu Station - (Higashi-Shimukappu Signal Ground) - (Takinosawa Signal Ground) - (Horoka Signal Ground) - Tomamu Station
