= Ōzora (train) =

Japanese passenger train service

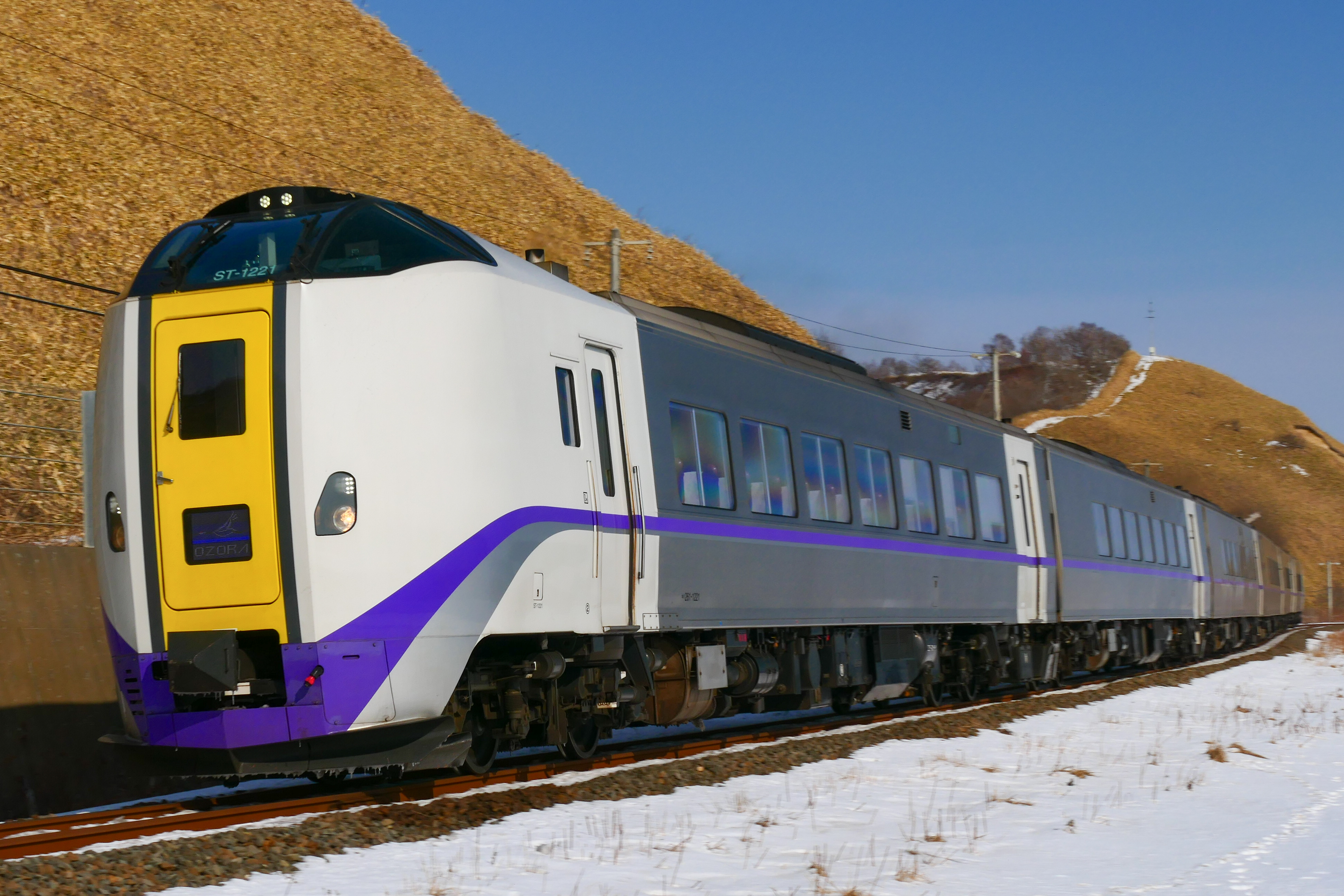
- KiHa 261-1000 series DMU on an Ōzora service, February 2023

Overview
- Service type: Limited express
- Status: Operational
- Locale: Sekishō Line; Nemuro Line
- First service: 1 October 1961 (Ōzora); 22 March 1997 (Super Ōzora)
- Last service: 13 March 2020 (Super Ōzora)
- Current operator: JR Hokkaido
- Former operator: JNR

Route
- Termini: Sapporo; Kushiro
- Stops: 15
- Distance travelled: 348.5 km (216.5 mi)
- Average journey time: 3 hours 58 minutes approx
- Service frequency: 6 return services daily

On-board services
- Class(es): Standard + Green
- Disabled access: Yes
- Sleeping arrangements: None
- Catering facilities: None
- Observation facilities: None
- Entertainment facilities: None
- Other facilities: Toilets

Technical
- Rolling stock: KiHa 261 series DMU; KiHa 283 series DMU
- Track gauge: 1,067 mm (3 ft 6 in)
- Electrification: Diesel
- Operating speed: 110 km/h (68 mph)
- Track owner: JR Hokkaido

The Ōzora (おおぞら) is a limited express train service between Sapporo and Kushiro in Hokkaido, Japan, operated by Hokkaido Railway Company (JR Hokkaido). There are six trains per day running in both directions, with the fastest journeys taking 3 hours 58 minutes.

== History ==
The service commenced as the limited express Ōzora (おおぞら) on 1 October 1961, operating between Hakodate and Asahikawa using KiHa 80 series DMUs with one return working daily. The service was extended to run between Hakodate and Kushiro from 1967. By 1973, there were three return workings daily. In October 1980, following the opening of New Chitose Airport, services were reorganized, with just one return working daily between Sapporo and Kushiro. From October 1981, the train was rerouted via the Sekishō Line, reducing journey times by approximately one hour. From 22 March 1997, four Ōzora services were upgraded to become Super Ōzora (スーパーおおぞら) following the introduction of new KiHa 283 series tilting DMUs. The remaining Ōzora services using KiHa 183 series DMUs were phased out by 2001. KiHa 261 series DMUs were introduced on 14 March 2020, and the service has since been returned to simply Ōzora.

== Stops ==
Trains stop at the following stations:

Sapporo - Shin-Sapporo - Minami-Chitose - (Oiwake) - (Shin-Yubari) - (Shimukappu) - Tomamu - Shintoku - (Tokachi-Shimizu) - (Memuro) - Obihiro - Ikeda - (Urahoro) - (Shiranuka) - Kushiro

Stations in brackets () are stations where only some trains stop at.

== Rolling stock ==
The Ōzora is operated by 6-car KiHa 283 series and KiHa 261 series DMUs, with car 1 at the Kushiro (eastern) end. All cars are no-smoking.

For departures using KiHa 283 series, cars 1, 2 and 4 to 6 are ordinary-class cars with 2+2 seating, and car 3 is a "Green" car with 2+1 seating.

Car No.	1	2	3	4	5	6
Accommodation	Reserved	Reserved	Green	Reserved	Non-reserved	Non-reserved
Facilities	Toilets		Toilets	Wheelchair space, accessible toilet		Toilets

For departures using KiHa 261 series, car 1 is a "Green" car with 2+1 seating, and cars 2 to 6 are ordinary-class cars with 2+2 seating.

Car No.	1	2	3	4	5	6
Accommodation	Green	Reserved	Reserved	Reserved	Non-reserved	Non-reserved
Facilities		Wheelchair space, accessible toilet	Toilets	Toilets	Toilets	

=== Former rolling stock ===
- KiHa 80 series DMUs
- KiHa 183 series DMUs (1980–2001)
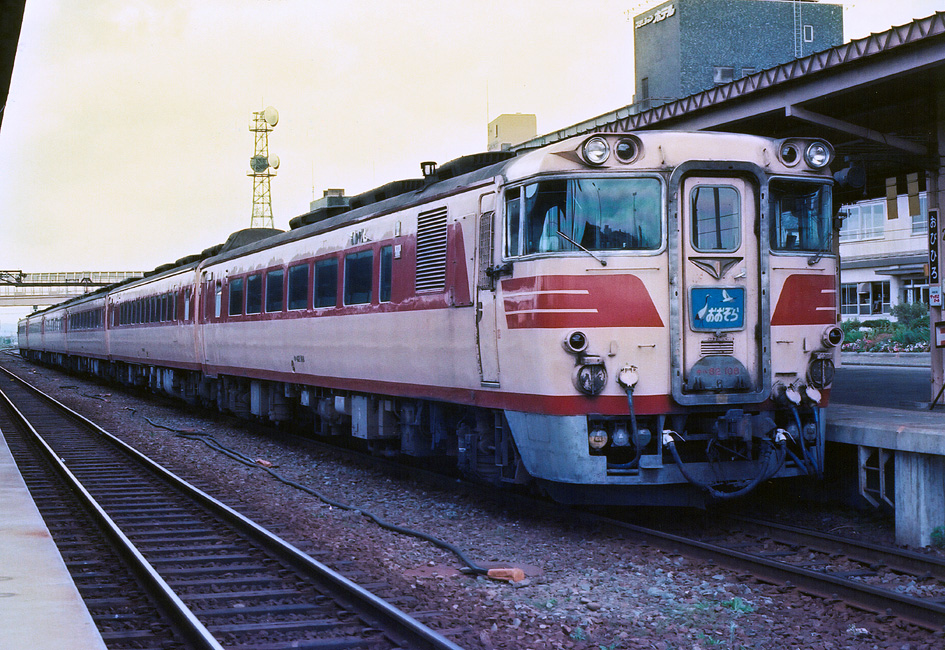
KiHa 80 series DMU on an Ōzora service in 1986

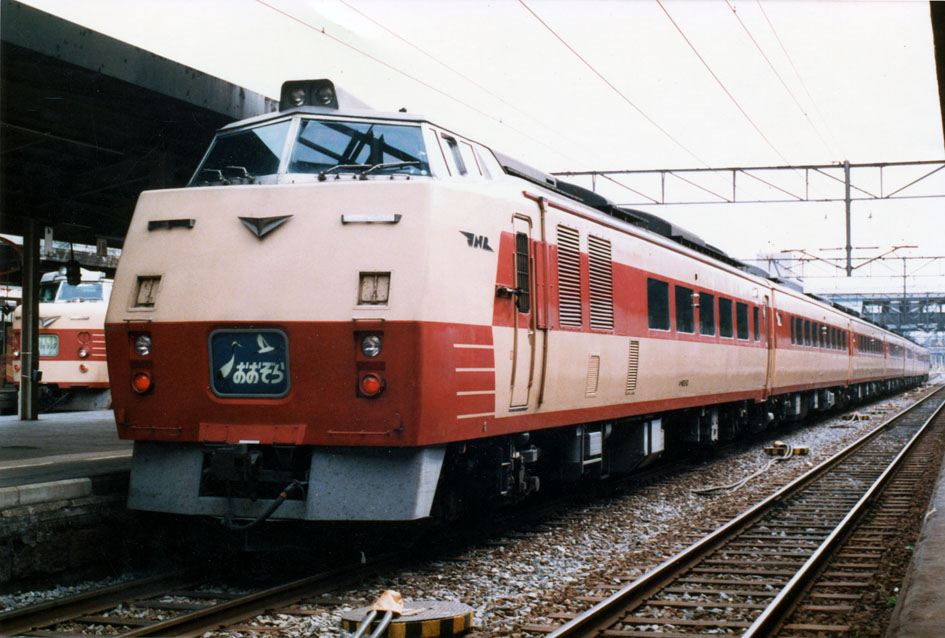
KiHa 183 series DMU on an Ōzora service at Sapporo Station in 1986

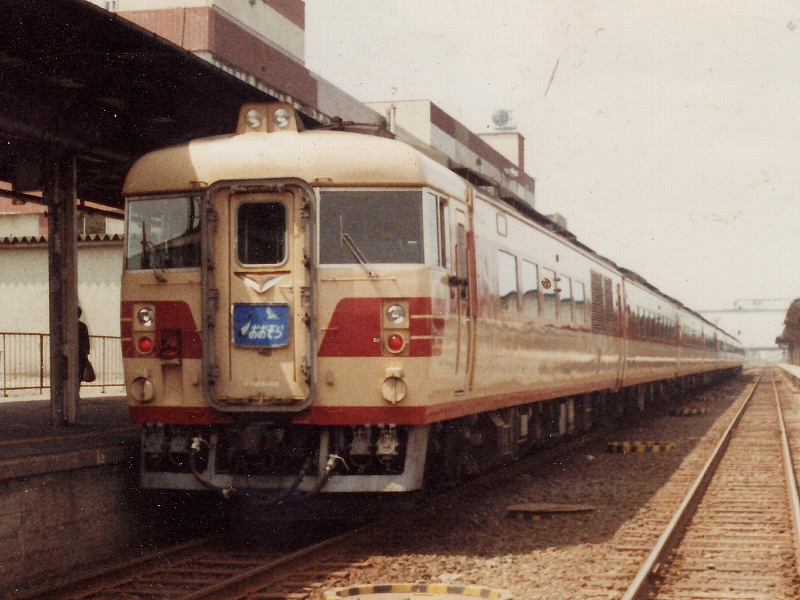
KiHa 183 series DMU on an Ōzora service in 1984

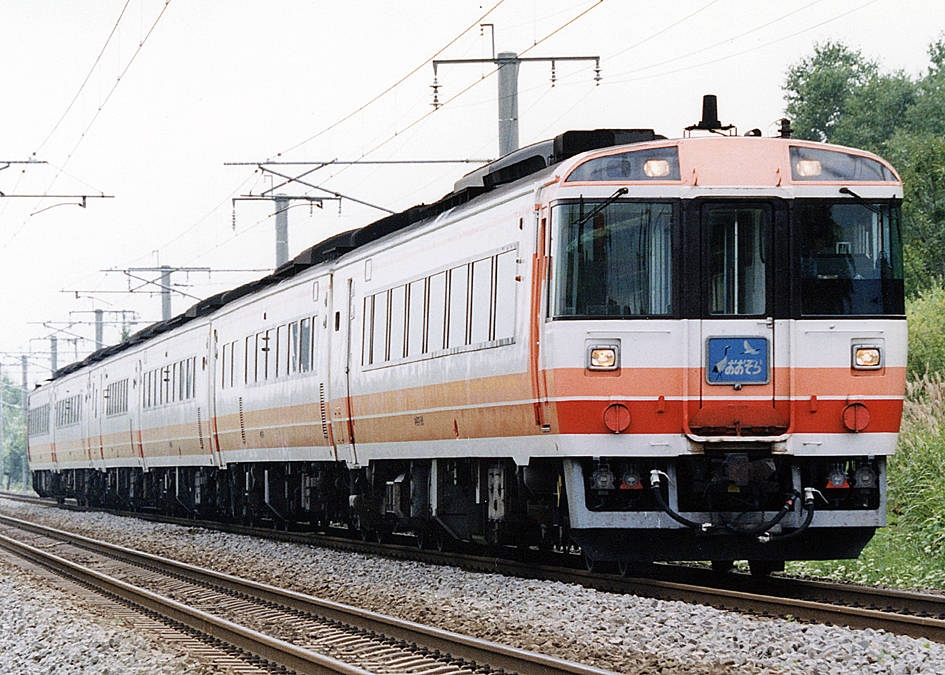
KiHa 183 series DMU on an Ōzora service in 1992

== 2011 derailment and fire ==
On 27 May 2011, the Super Ōzora 14 service from Kushiro to Sapporo was brought to an emergency stop inside the 685-metre-long (2,247 ft 5 in) No. 1 Niniu Tunnel in Shimukappu, Hokkaidō, at around 21:55 after car number 2 of the 6-car formation became derailed. The train caught fire, and all of the 245 people on board, including train staff eventually evacuated the train. 39 were treated for smoke inhalation and minor burn injuries. The burnt-out train was removed from the tunnel on 29 May 2011.
