= Tomamu Station =

Railway station in Shimukappu, Hokkaido, Japan

Coordinates: 43°3′21.7″N 142°36′40.3″E

Tomamu Station トマム駅
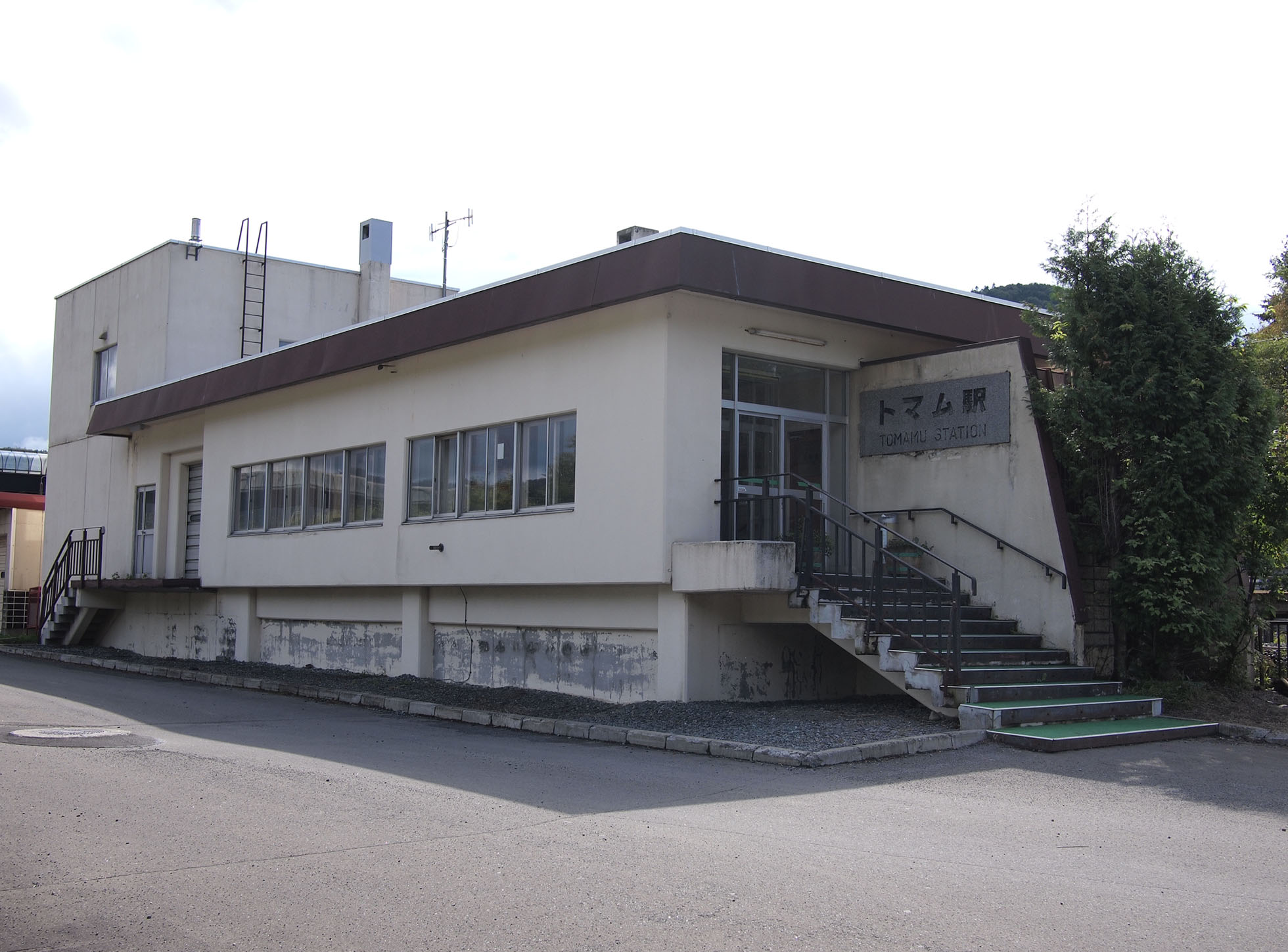
- Tomamu Station (September 2011)

General information
- Location: Shimukappu, Yūfutsu District; Hokkaido Prefecture; Japan
- Operator: JR Hokkaido
- Line: Sekishō Line
- Platforms: 2 side platforms
- Tracks: 2
- Connections: Bus

Construction
- Structure type: At grade

Other information
- Status: Unstaffed
- Station code: K22

History
- Opened: 1 October 1981; 45 years ago
- Former names: Sekishō-Kōgen (until 1987)

Passengers
- 2014: 40 daily

Services
Preceding station	JR Hokkaido	Following station
Shimukappu towards Minami-Chitose	Sekishō Line	Shintoku Terminus
Location
- Location within Hokkaido Location within Japan

Tomamu Station (トマム駅, Tomamu Eki) is a railway station on the JR Hokkaido Sekishō Line. It is located in Shimukappu, Hokkaidō, Japan.

== History ==
- 1 October 1981: Opened as Sekishō-Kōgen Station (石勝高原駅, Sekishō-Kōgen Eki)
- 1 February 1987: Renamed to Tomamu Station

== Station structure ==
The above-ground station has two platforms serving two tracks.

Platforms

1	■Sekishō Line	For Minami-Chitose and Sapporo
2	■Sekishō Line	For Obihiro and Kushiro

- The station is unstaffed.
- There is a JR reservation office in the hotel near the station.

== Adjacent stations ==
Hokkaido Railway Company
Sekishō Line

Shimukappu Station - (Higashi-Shimukappu Signal Ground) - (Takinosawa Signal Ground) - (Horoka Signal Ground) - Tomamu Station - (Kushinai Signal Ground) - (Kami-Ochiai Signal Ground) - (Shin-Karikachi Signal Ground) - (Hirouchi Signal Ground) - (Nishi-Shintoku Signal Ground) - Shintoku Station
