= Numanosawa Station =

Former railway station in Yūbari, Hokkaido, Japan

Coordinates: 42°57′27.35″N 142°1′51.08″E

Numanosawa Station 沼ノ沢駅
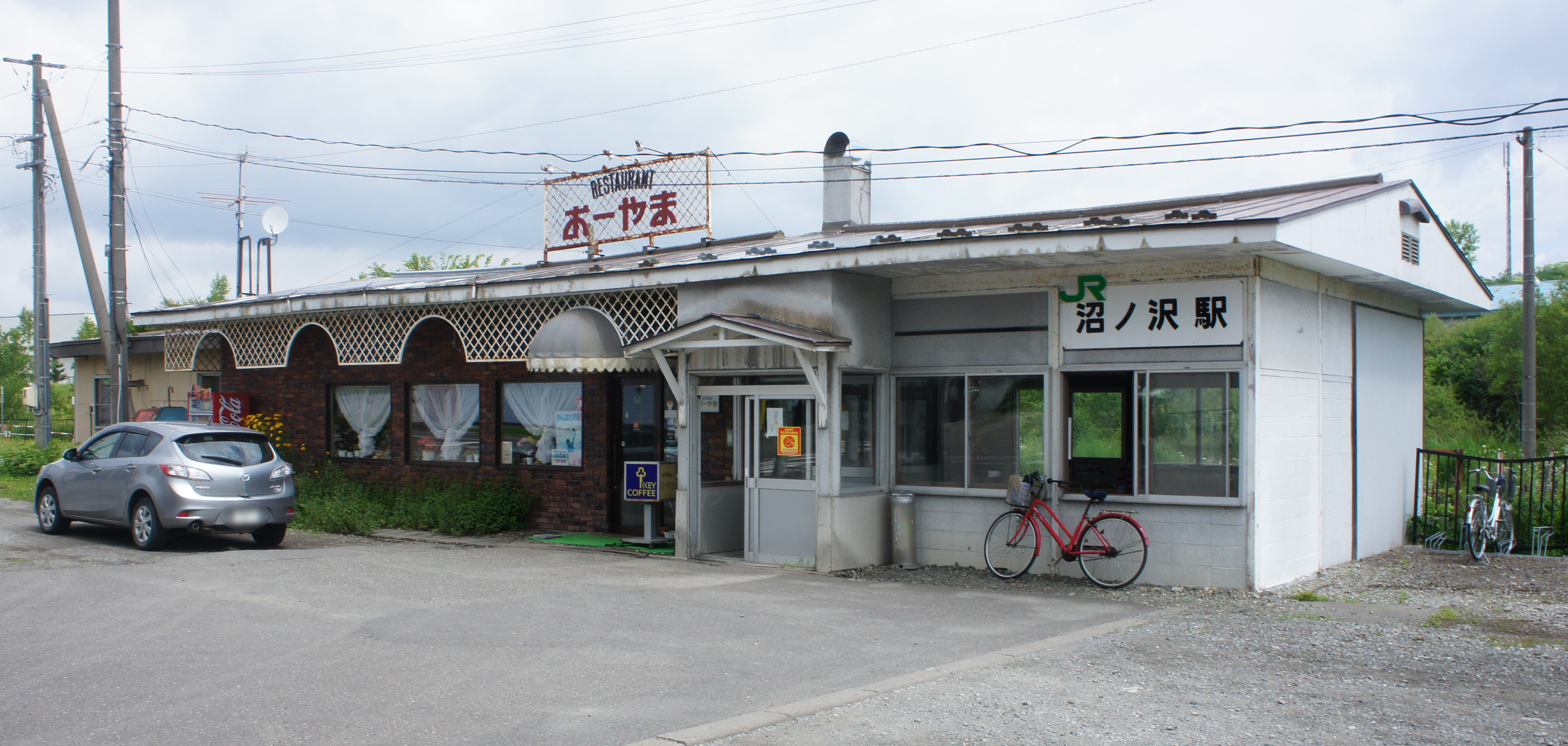
- Numanosawa Station in 2017

General information
- Location: Yūbari, Hokkaido; Japan
- Operator: JR Hokkaido
- Line: ■ Sekishō Line Yūbari Branch
- Distance: 2.7 km from Shin-Yūbari
- Platforms: 1 side platform
- Tracks: 1

Other information
- Status: Unstaffed
- Station code: Y21

History
- Opened: 15 November 1905
- Closed: 31 March 2019

Passengers
- FY1998: 74 daily
Location

Numanosawa Station (沼ノ沢駅, Numanosawa-eki) was a railway station in Yūbari, Hokkaidō, Japan. The station was closed when the Yubari Branch Line ceased operation on 31 March 2019.

== Lines ==
Numanosawa Station was served by the Sekisho Line Yūbari Branch. The station was numbered "Y21".

== Station layout ==
The station had a ground-level side platform serving one track. Kitaca was not available. The station was unattended.

== Adjacent stations ==
«	Service	»
Sekisho Line Yūbari Branch
Shin-Yūbari (K20)	Local	Minami-Shimizusawa (Y22)

== Surrounding area ==
- National Route 452
