= Abira Station =

Railway station in Abira, Hokkaido, Japan

Abira Station 安平駅
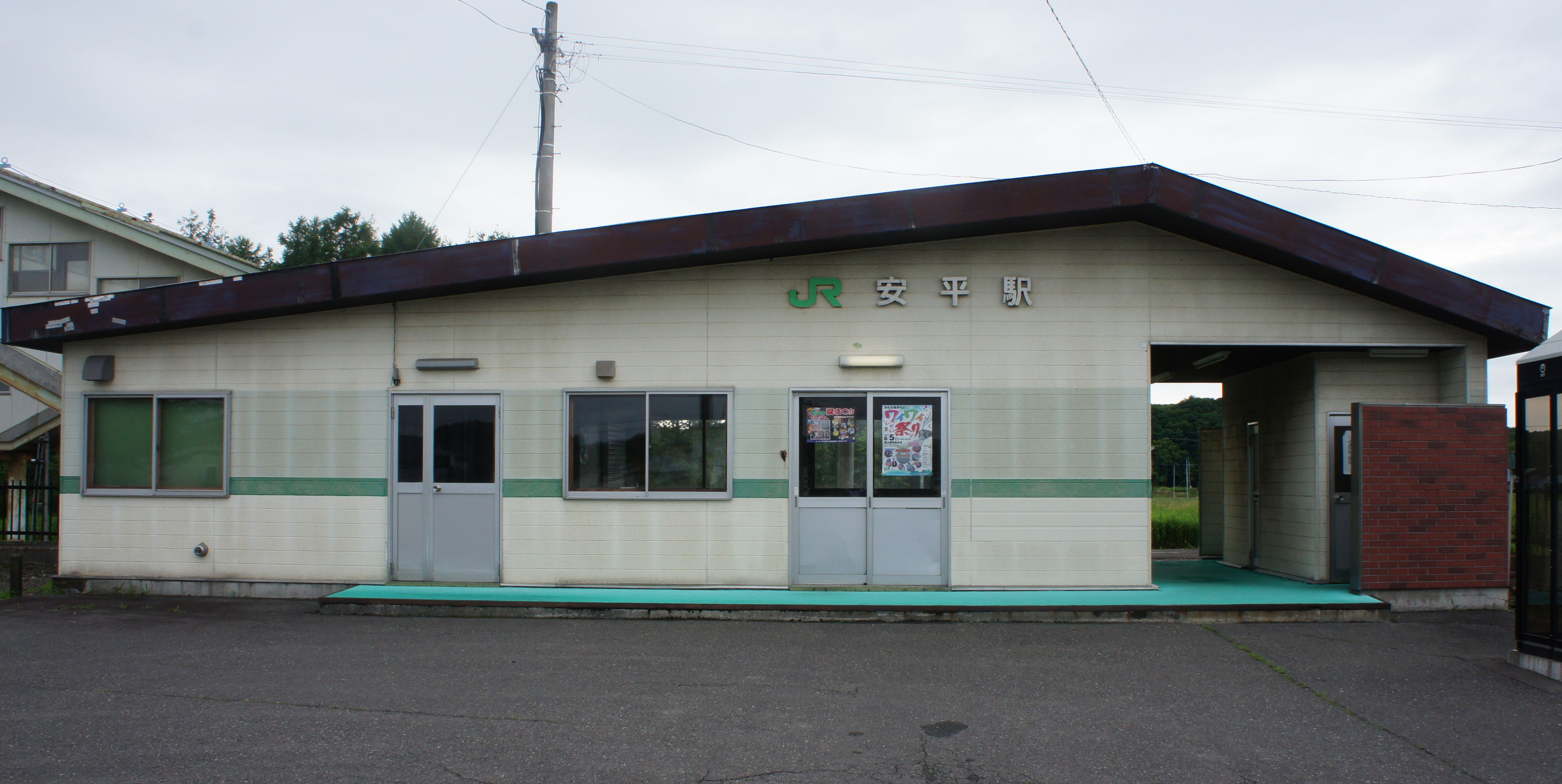
- Station building, July 2017

General information
- Location: Abira, Hokkaido; Japan
- Coordinates: 42°48′52″N 141°49′32″E
- Operator: JR Hokkaido
- Line: ■ Muroran Main Line
- Distance: 164.0 km from Oshamambe
- Platforms: 2 side platforms
- Tracks: 2

Other information
- Status: Unstaffed

History
- Opened: October 11, 1902
Location

Abira Station (安平駅, Abira-eki) is a train station operated by JR Hokkaido in Abira, Yūfutsu District, Hokkaidō, Japan.

== Lines ==
Abira Station is served by the Muroran Main Line.

== Station layout ==
The station has two ground-level opposed side platforms serving two tracks. Kitaca is not available. The station is unattended.

== Adjacent stations ==
«	Service	»
Muroran Main Line
Hayakita	-	Oiwake (K15)
