= Oiwake Station (Hokkaido) =

Railway station in Abira, Hokkaido, Japan

Coordinates: 42°52′24″N 141°48′39″E

K15 Oiwake Station 追分駅
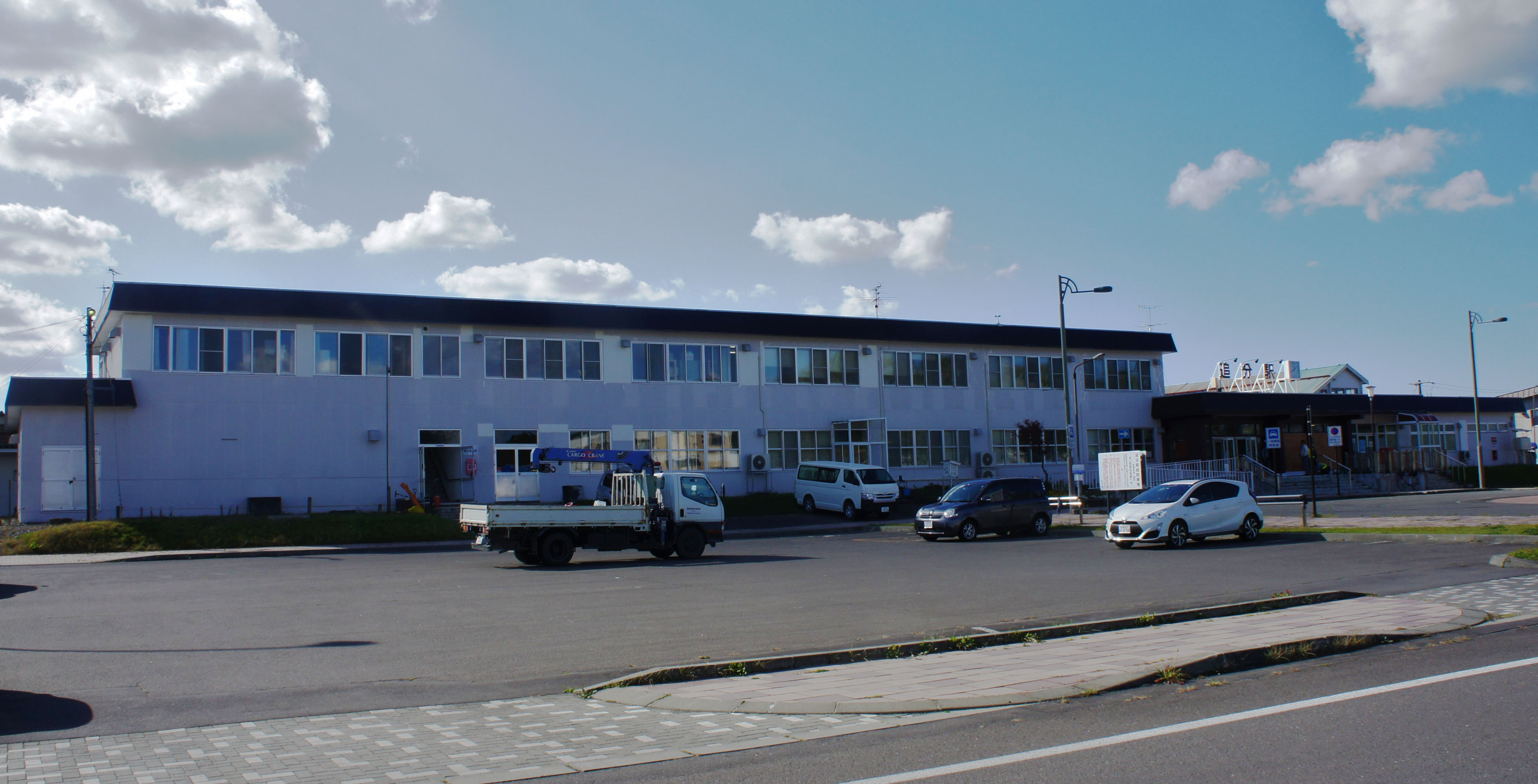
- Oiwake Station building and forecourt in September 2018

General information
- Location: Abira; Hokkaido Prefecture; Japan
- Operator: JR Hokkaido
- Lines: Muroran Main Line; Sekishō Line
- Distance: 170.8 km (106.1 mi) from Oshamambe
- Platforms: 1 side + 1 island platforms
- Tracks: 4

Construction
- Structure type: At grade

Other information
- Status: Staffed
- Station code: K15

History
- Opened: 1 August 1892; 134 years ago

Services
Preceding station	JR Hokkaido	Following station
Abira towards Oshamambe	Muroran Main Line Local	Mikawa towards Iwamizawa
Minami-Chitose Terminus	Sekishō Line	Kawabata towards Shintoku
Limited Express
Minami-Chitose towards Sapporo	Tokachi	Shin-Yubari towards Obihiro
Minami-Chitose towards Sapporo	Ōzora	Shin-Yubari towards Kushiro
Location
- Location within Hokkaido Location within Japan

Oiwake Station (追分駅, Oiwake-eki) is a railway station in Abira, Hokkaido, Japan, operated by Hokkaido Railway Company (JR Hokkaido). The station is numbered K15.

== Lines ==
Oiwake Station is served by the Muroran Main Line and Sekishō Line.

== Station layout ==
The station has two ground-level platforms serving four tracks. The station has a "Midori no Madoguchi" staffed ticket office. The Kitaca farecard cannot be used at this station.

=== Platforms ===
1	■ Sekishō Line	for Minami-Chitose and Sapporo for Obihiro and Kushiro
2	■ Muroran Main Line	for Tomakomai for Iwamizawa
2	■ Sekishō Line	for Shin-Yūbari
3	■ Muroran Main Line	for Iwamizawa
3	■ Sekishō Line	for Shin-Yūbari
4	■ Sekishō Line	(Terminating services)

== History ==
The station opened on 1 November 1892. With the privatization of Japanese National Railways (JNR) on 1 April 1987, the station came under the control of JR Hokkaido.

== See also ==
- List of railway stations in Japan
