= Toasa Station =

Railway station in Abira, Hokkaido, Japan

Coordinates: 42.7289°N 141.7693°E

Toasa Station 遠浅駅
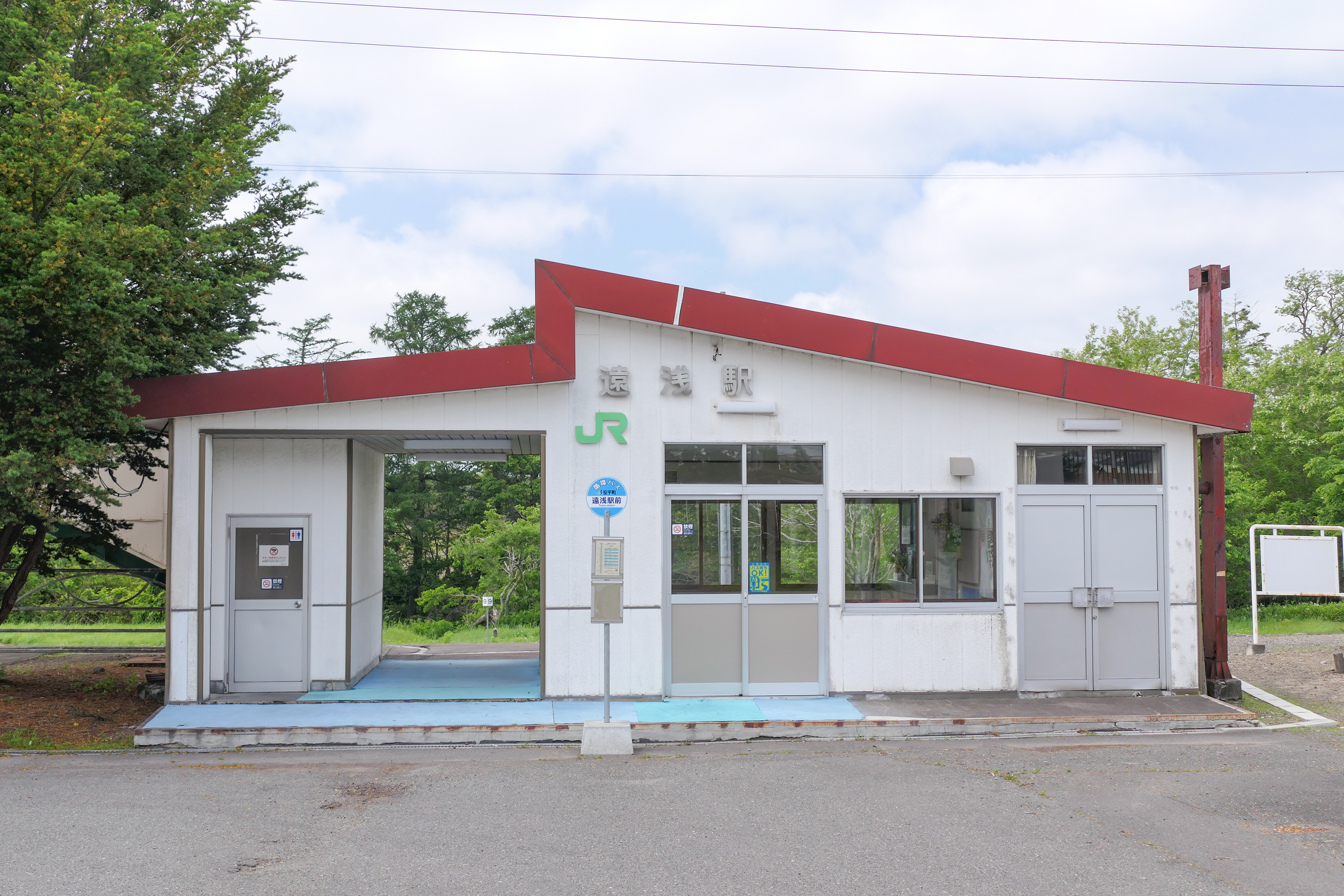

General information
- Location: Abira, Hokkaido; Japan
- Operator: JR Hokkaido
- Line: ■ Muroran Main Line
- Distance: 152.9 km from Oshamambe
- Platforms: 2 side platforms
- Tracks: 2

Other information
- Status: Unstaffed

History
- Opened: September 21, 1902
Location

Toasa Station (遠浅駅, Toasa-eki) is a train station in Abira, Yūfutsu District, Hokkaidō, Japan.

== Lines ==
Toasa Station is served by the Muroran Main Line.

== Station layout ==
The station has two ground-level opposed side platforms connected by a footbridge, serving two tracks. Kitaca is not available. The station is unattended.

== Adjacent stations ==
«	Service	»
Muroran Main Line
Numanohata (H17)	-	Hayakita
