= Shin-Yūbari Station =

Railway station in Yūbari, Hokkaido, Japan

Coordinates: 42°56′11.75″N 142°2′11.71″E

Shin-Yūbari Station 新夕張駅
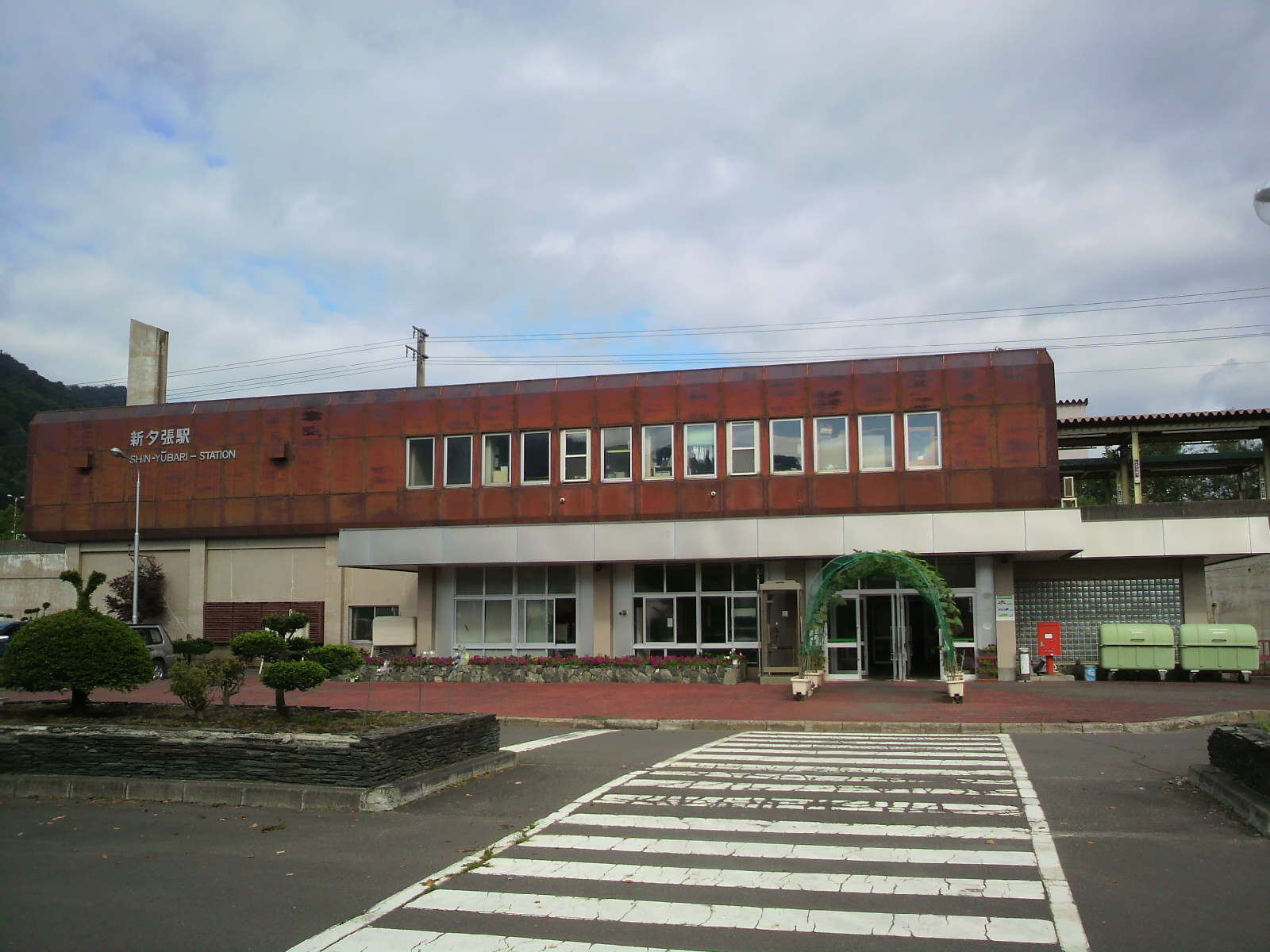
- The station building in August 2010

General information
- Location: Yūbari, Hokkaido; Japan
- Operator: JR Hokkaido
- Lines: Sekishō Line; Sekishō Line – Yūbari Branch
- Distance: 43.0 km (26.7 mi) from Minami-Chitose
- Platforms: 2 island platforms
- Tracks: 4

Construction
- Structure type: At grade

Other information
- Status: Staffed
- Station code: K20

History
- Opened: 1 November 1892; 133 years ago
- Former names: Momijiyama (until 1981)

Passengers
- FY2007: 107 daily

Services
Preceding station	JR Hokkaido	Following station
Kawabata towards Minami-Chitose	Sekishō Line	Shimukappu towards Shintoku
Oiwake towards Sapporo	Ōzora	Shimukappu towards Kushiro
Oiwake towards Sapporo	Tokachi	Shimukappu towards Obihiro
Location
- Location within Hokkaido Location within Japan

Shin-Yūbari Station (新夕張駅, Shin-Yūbari-eki) is a railway station on the Sekishō Line in Yūbari, Hokkaido, Japan, operated by Hokkaido Railway Company (JR Hokkaido).

== Lines ==
Shin-Yūbari Station is served by the Sekisho Line, and is situated 43.0 km from the starting point of the line at Minami-Chitose Station. The station is numbered "K20". It was also the terminal station for Sekishō Line Yūbari Branch before the line ceased operation on 31 March 2019.

== Station layout ==
The station has two ground-level island platforms serving four tracks. The station has an automated ticket machine and a "Midori no Madoguchi" staffed ticket office. The Kitaca farecard cannot be used at this station.

=== Platforms ===
1	■ Sekishō Line	Limited express for Oiwake and Sapporo; Limited express for Obihiro and Kushiro
2	■ Sekishō Line	extra
3,4	■ Sekishō Line	Local trains for Oiwake and Chitose

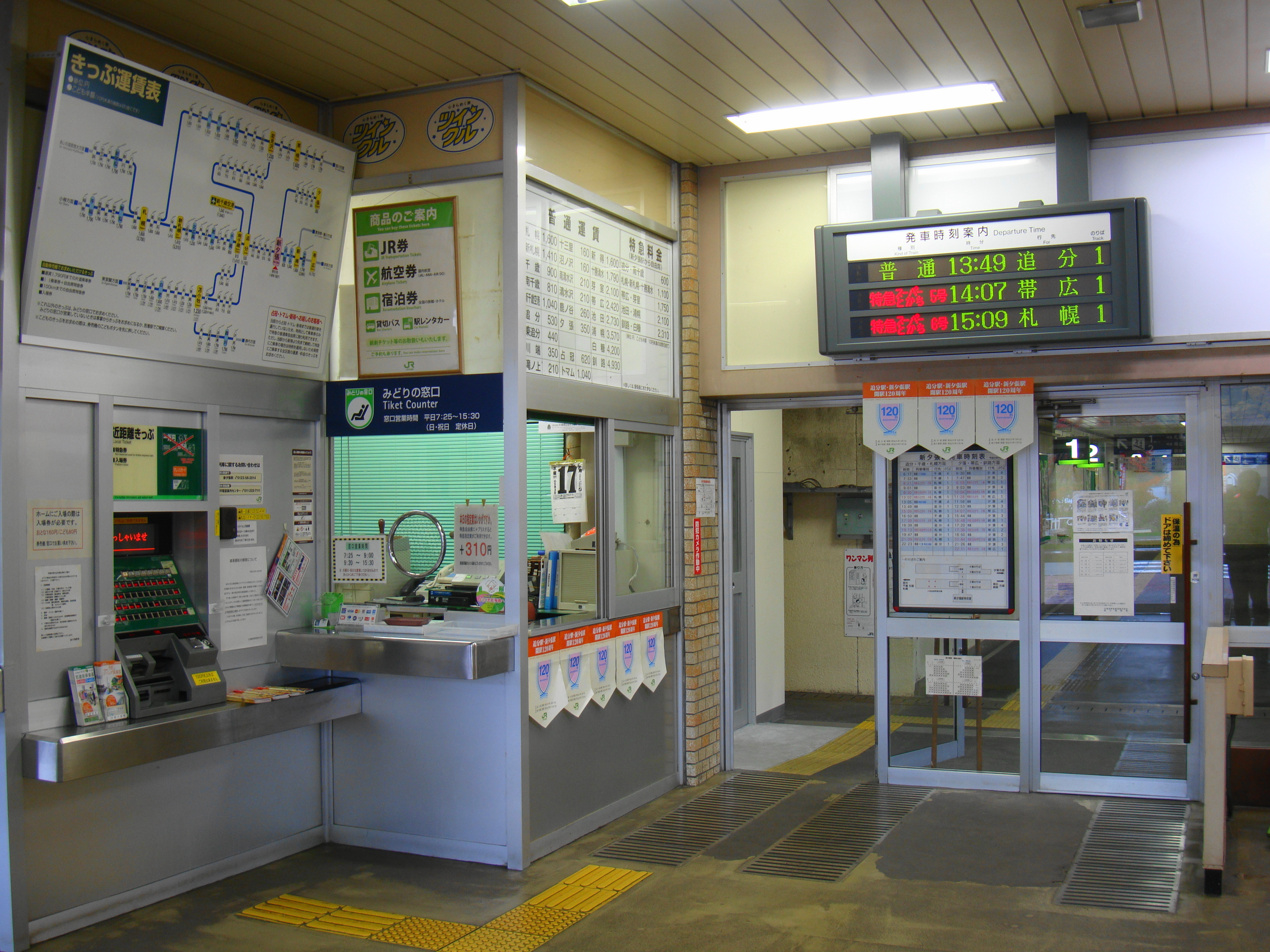
The ticket office and entrance

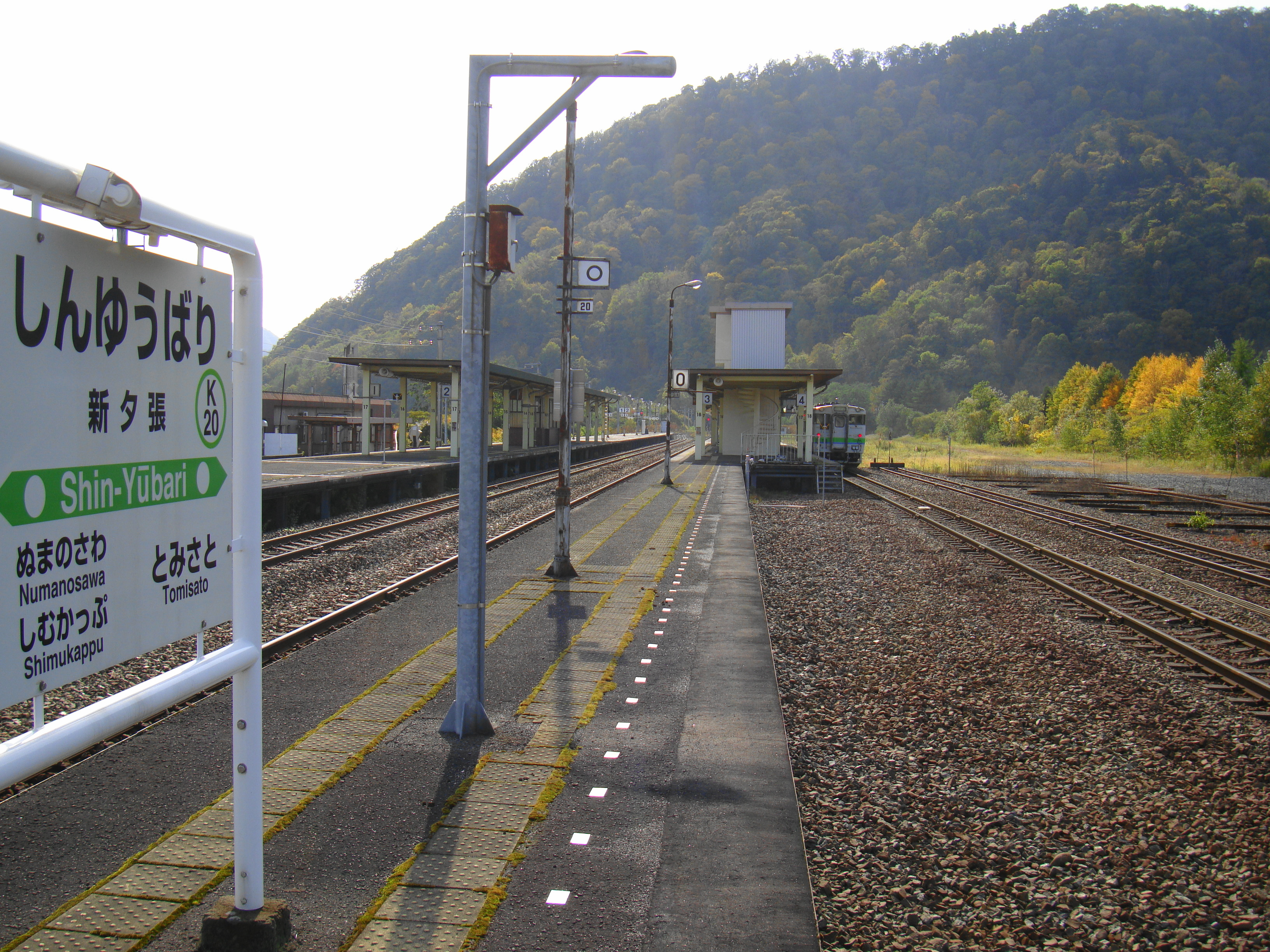
The platforms

== History ==
The station opened on 1 November 1892 as Momijiyama Station (紅葉山駅). It was renamed Shin-Yubari on 1 October 1981. With the privatization of Japanese National Railways (JNR) on 1 April 1987, the station came under the control of JR Hokkaido. The Yūbari Branch Line was discontinued on 31 March 2019.

== Surrounding area ==
- Momijiyama Post office

== See also ==
- List of railway stations in Japan
