= Kawabata Station =

Railway station in Yuni, Hokkaido, Japan

Coordinates: 42.9150°N 141.8948°E

Kawabata Station 川端駅
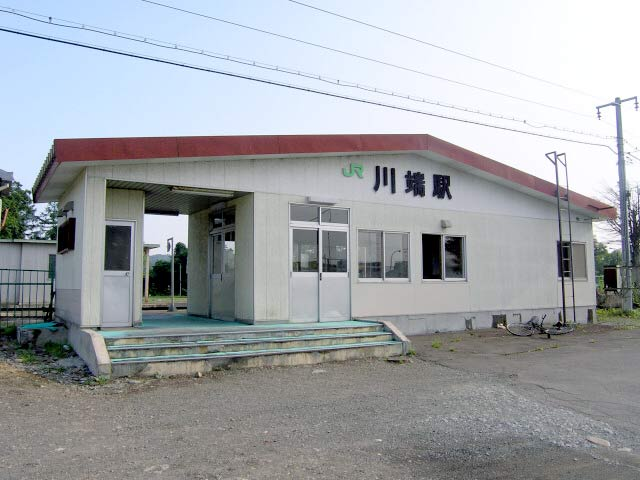
- The station building in July 2004

General information
- Location: Yuni, Hokkaido; Japan
- Operator: JR Hokkaido
- Line: Sekishō Line
- Distance: 27.0 km (16.8 mi) from Minami-Chitose
- Platforms: 1 side + 1 island platforms
- Tracks: 3

Construction
- Structure type: At grade

Other information
- Status: Unstaffed
- Station code: K17

History
- Opened: 1 August 1893; 133 years ago

Services
Preceding station	JR Hokkaido	Following station
Oiwake towards Minami-Chitose	Sekishō Line	Shin-Yūbari towards Shintoku
Ōzora does not stop here
Tokachi does not stop here
Location
- Location within Hokkaido Location within Japan

Kawabata Station (川端駅, Kawabata-eki) is a railway station on the Sekisho Line in Yuni, Yūfutsu District, Hokkaido, Japan, operated by Hokkaido Railway Company (JR Hokkaido).

== Lines ==
Kawabata Station is served by the Sekisho Line, and is situated 27.0 km from the starting point of the line at Minami-Chitose Station. The station is numbered "K17".

== Station layout ==
The station has one side platform and one island platform connected by a footbridge, serving three tracks. Kitaca is not available. The station is unattended.

== History ==
The station opened on 1 August 1893. With the privatization of Japanese National Railways (JNR) on 1 April 1987, the station came under the control of JR Hokkaido.

== See also ==
- List of railway stations in Japan
