= Kushiro Station (Hokkaido) =

Railway station in Kushiro, Hokkaido, Japan

K53 Kushiro Station 釧路駅
- Station building, October 2026

General information
- Location: 1-78 Kitaodori 14-chome, Kushiro-shi, Hokkaido 085-0015; Japan
- Coordinates: 42°59′24.9″N 144°22′56.1″E
- System: regional rail
- Operator: JR Hokkaido; JR Freight
- Lines: Nemuro Main Line; Senmō Main Line
- Distance: 172.1 km from Shintoku
- Platforms: 1 side + 2 island platforms
- Tracks: 5
- Connections: Bus stop

Other information
- Status: Staffed (Midori no Madoguchi)
- Station code: K53
- Website: Official website

History
- Opened: 20 July 1901; 125 years ago

Passengers
- FY2022: 755 daily

Services
Preceding station	JR Hokkaido	Following station
Shin-Fuji towards Takikawa	Nemuro Main Line Local	Higashi-Kushiro towards Nemuro
Higashi-Kushiro towards Abashiri	Senmō Main Line Local	Terminus
Location
- Location within Hokkaido Location within Japan

Kushiro Station (釧路駅, Kushiro-eki) is a railway station located in the city of Kushiro, Hokkaidō, Japan. It is operated by JR Hokkaido.

== Lines ==
The station is served by the Nemuro Main Line, and lies 172.1 km from the starting point of the line at Shintoku. Trains of the Senmō Main Line also normally continue past the nominal terminus of that line at Higashi-Kushiro to terminate at this station.

== Layout ==
Kushiro Station has one side platform and two island platforms. The station building is located adjacted to the side platform. The platforms are connected by an underground passageway. The Ozora limited express services depart from and arrive at platform 1. Escalators are installed between platforms 1 and 2-3. Platform 6, which once served the defunct Yubetsu Railway, once existed, but the platform has been removed and the underground passage to the platform is closed. The station is staffed and has a Midori no Madoguchi ticket office. The station facilities occupy only the first floor of the four-story station building, with the remaining floors occupied by various offices and businesses.

=== Platforms ===
1-4	■ Nemuro Main Line	for Obihiro, Shintoku, Sapporo
1-5	■ Senmō Main Line	for Mashū and Abashiri

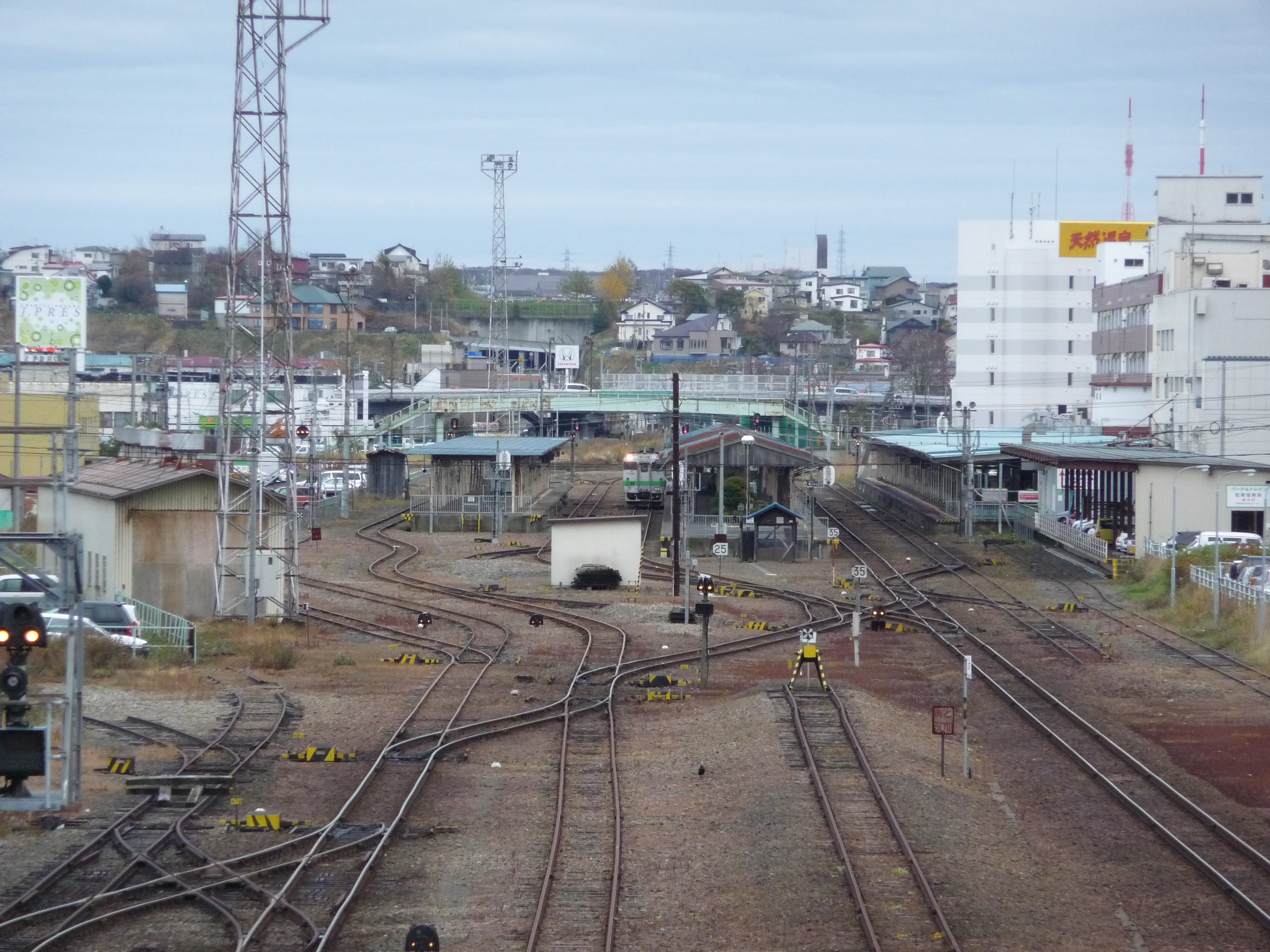
Station yard

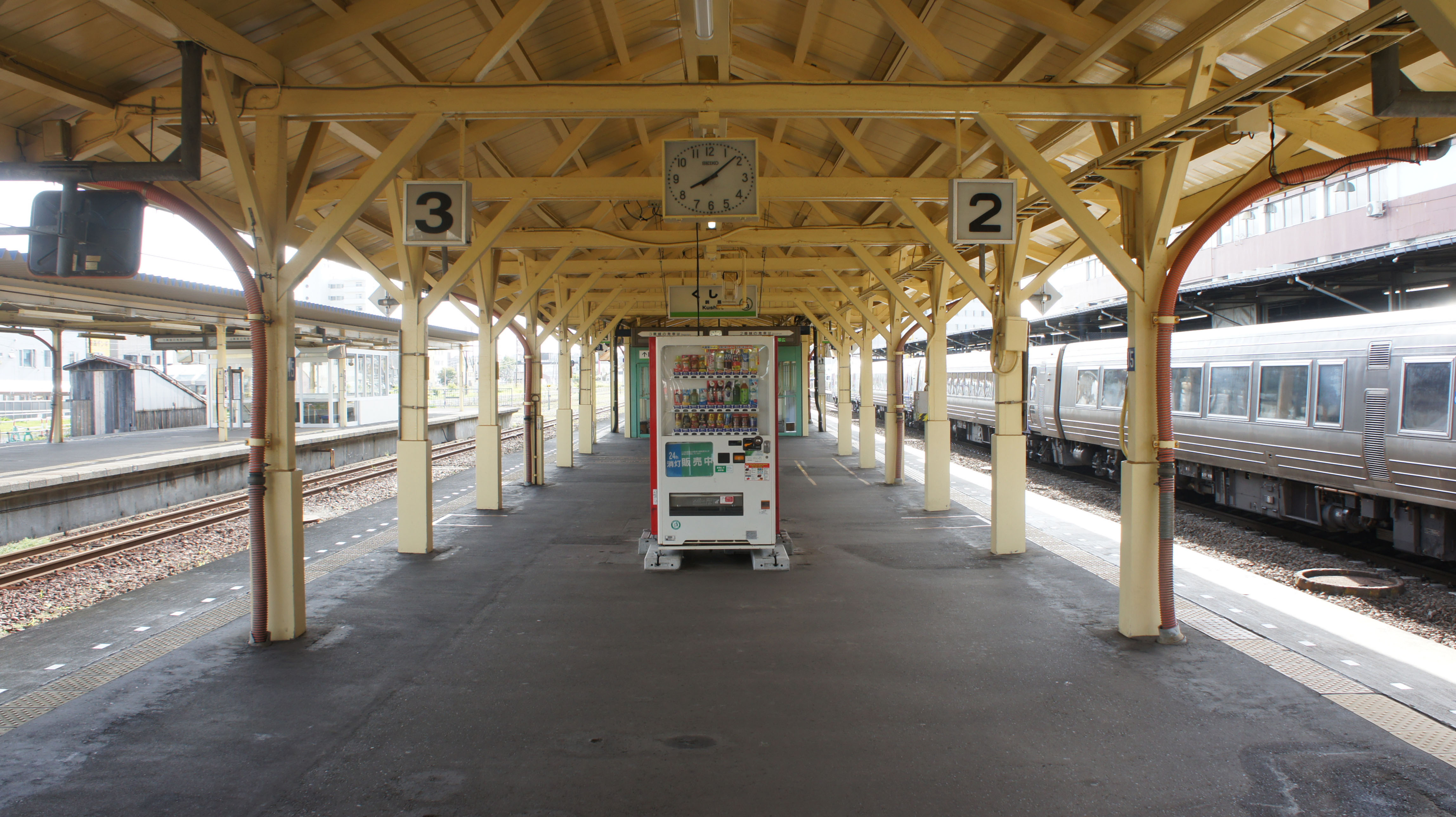
Platforms 2-3

== History ==
The first station opened on 20 July 1901 as a station on the Hokkaidō Kansetsu Tetsudō. It was transferred to the Ministry of Railways on 1 April 1905. However, the station was relocated to its present site on 1 December 1917 and the original station became a freight-only station and was renamed "Hama-Kurishiro Station". Officially, the Hokkaido Railway lists the opening date as 1901, the year the station opened before its relocation. The Senmo Man Line began operations on 15 September 1927. The present station building was completed on 1 August 1961. Following the privatization of the Japanese National Railways on 1 April 1987, the station came under the control of JR Hokkaido and Japan Freight Railway Company. Freight operations were discontinued in 2006

== Passenger statistics ==
In fiscal 2022, the station was used by an average of 754.6 passengers daily.

== Surrounding area ==
- Kushiro General Bureau Building
- Kushiro City Hall
- Kushiro Police Station
- Kushiro District Court
- Kushiro Central Post Office

== See also ==
- List of railway stations in Japan
