= Bibi Station =

Railway station in Chitose, Hokkaido, Japan

Coordinates: 42.7777°N 141.7117°E

Bibi Station 美々駅
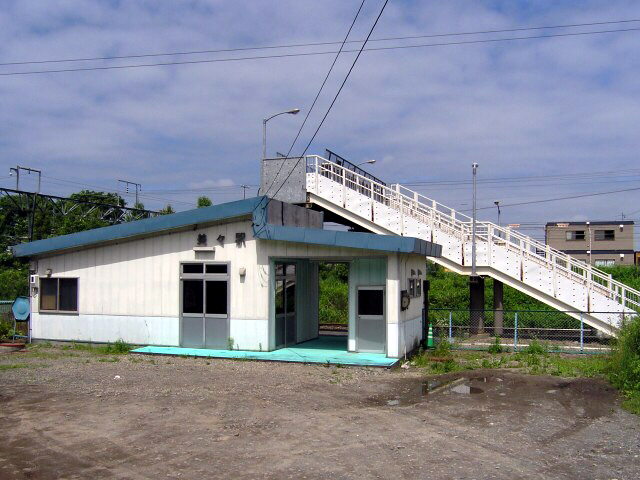
- Station building, July 2004

General information
- Location: Chitose, Hokkaido; Japan
- Operator: JR Hokkaido
- Line: ■ Chitose Line
- Distance: 13.9 km from Numanohata
- Platforms: 1 side + 1 island platforms
- Tracks: 3

Other information
- Status: Unstaffed
- Station code: H15

History
- Opened: August 21, 1926
- Closed: March 3, 2017

Passengers
- FY2012: 4 daily
Location
- Location within Japan

Bibi Station (美々駅, Bibi-eki) was a railway station on the Chitose Line located in Chitose, Hokkaidō, Japan. The station was numbered H15.

== Lines ==
Bibi Station was served by the Chitose Line.

== Station layout ==
The station consisted of two ground-level platforms serving three tracks. The station had Kitaca card readers (not equipped with regular ticket gates).

=== Platforms ===
1	■ Chitose Line	for Tomakomai
2	■ Chitose Line	for Tomakomai for Sapporo and Otaru
3	■ Chitose Line	for Sapporo and Otaru

== Adjacent stations ==
«	Service	»
Chitose Line
Uenae (H16)	Local	Minami-Chitose (H14)
