= Naebo Station =

Railway station in Sapporo, Japan

Coordinates: 43°4′6.89″N 141°22′23.93″E

H02 Naebo Station 苗穂駅
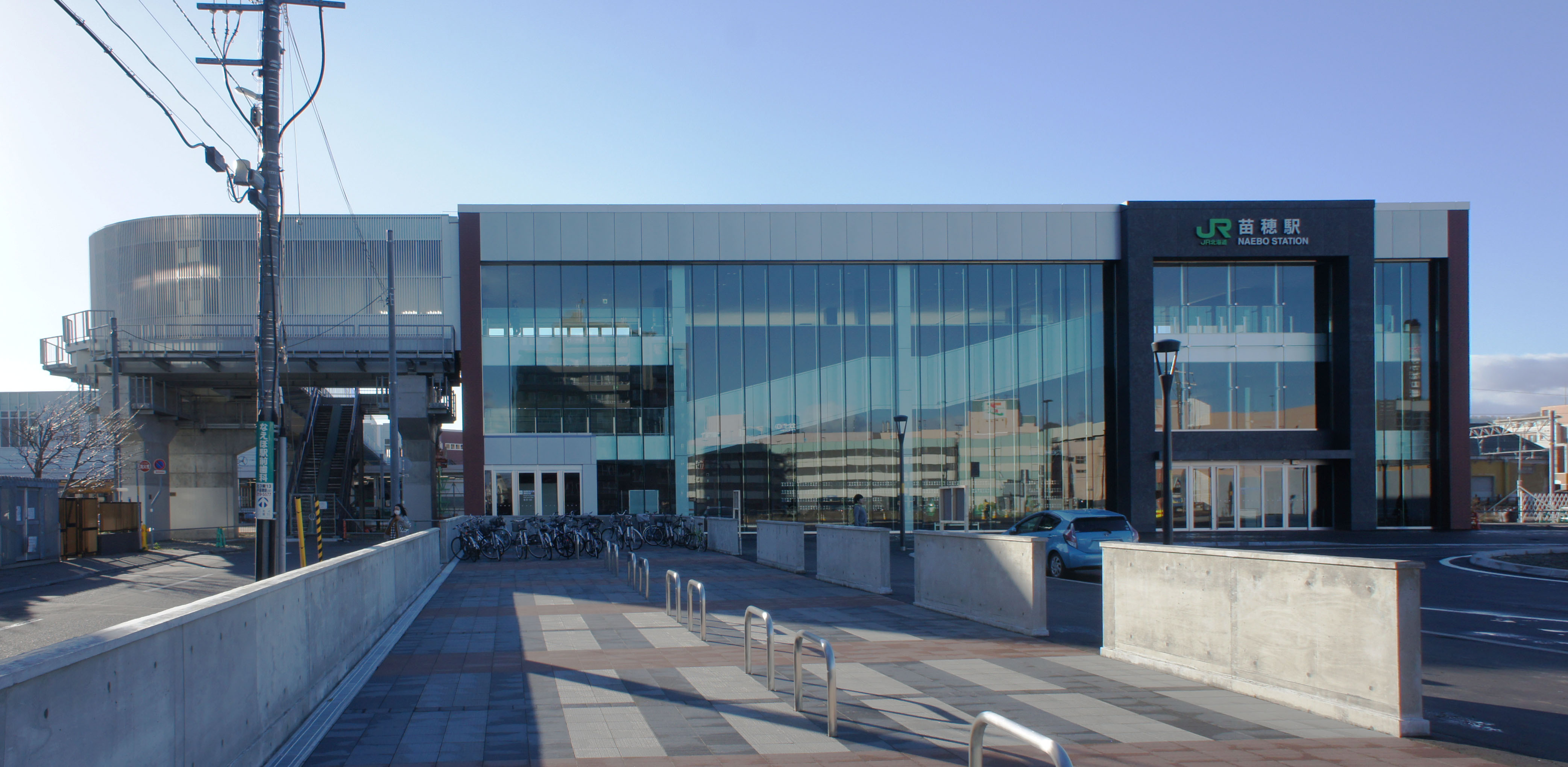
- North Exit, in November 2018

General information
- Location: Chūō-ku, Sapporo; Hokkaido Prefecture; Japan
- Operator: JR Hokkaido
- Lines: Hakodate Main Line; Chitose Line
- Distance: 288.5 km (179.3 mi) from Hakodate
- Platforms: 2 island platforms
- Tracks: 4

Construction
- Structure type: Ground

Other information
- Status: Staffed (Midori no Madoguchi)
- Station code: H02

History
- Opened: 16 May 1910; 116 years ago

Passengers
- FY2014: 4,176 daily

Services
Preceding station	JR Hokkaido	Following station
Shiroishi towards Numanohata or New Chitose Airport	Chitose Line Local	Sapporo Terminus
Sapporo towards Hakodate	Hakodate Main Line Local	Shiroishi towards Asahikawa

Other services
Preceding station	JR Hokkaido	Following station
Limited Express
Ōzora does not stop here
Tokachi does not stop here
Location
- Location within Hokkaido Location within Japan

Naebo Station (苗穂駅, Naebo-eki) is a railway station in Chūō-ku, Sapporo, Hokkaidō, Japan. It is served by Hakodate Main Line and Chitose Line. The station is numbered H02.

== Station layout ==
The station consists of two island platforms connected by a footbridge, serving four tracks. The station has automated ticket machines, automated turnstiles which accept Kitaca, and a "Midori no Madoguchi" staffed ticket office.

=== Platforms ===
3	■ Hakodate Main Line	for Sapporo and Otaru
4	■ Chitose Line	for Sapporo and Otaru
5	■ Chitose Line	for New Chitose Airport and Tomakomai
6	■ Hakodate Main Line	for Ebetsu and Iwamizawa

== Adjacent stations ==
«	Service	»
Hakodate Main Line
Sapporo	Local	Shiroishi
Limited Express Sōya: Does not stop at this station
Limited Express Okhotsk: Does not stop at this station

== Surrounding area ==
- Toyohira River
- National Route 12, (to Asahikawa)
- National Route 275, (to Hamatonbetsu)
- JR Hokkaido Naebo Workshop, Hokkaido Railway Technology Museum
- JR Hokkaido Naebo Operation Office
- JR Hokkaido Training Center
- JR Freight Vehicle factory
- Sapporo Beer Museum
- Japan Ground Self-Defense Force Vice-Camp Naebo
- Sapporo Factory
- Taiheiyo Cement, Sapporo branch
- Hokkaido Nippon Ham Fighters Indoor Practice Field
