= Shiroishi Station (JR Hokkaido) =

Railway station in Sapporo, Japan

Coordinates: 43°3′17″N 141°24′49″E

H03 Shiroishi Station 白石駅
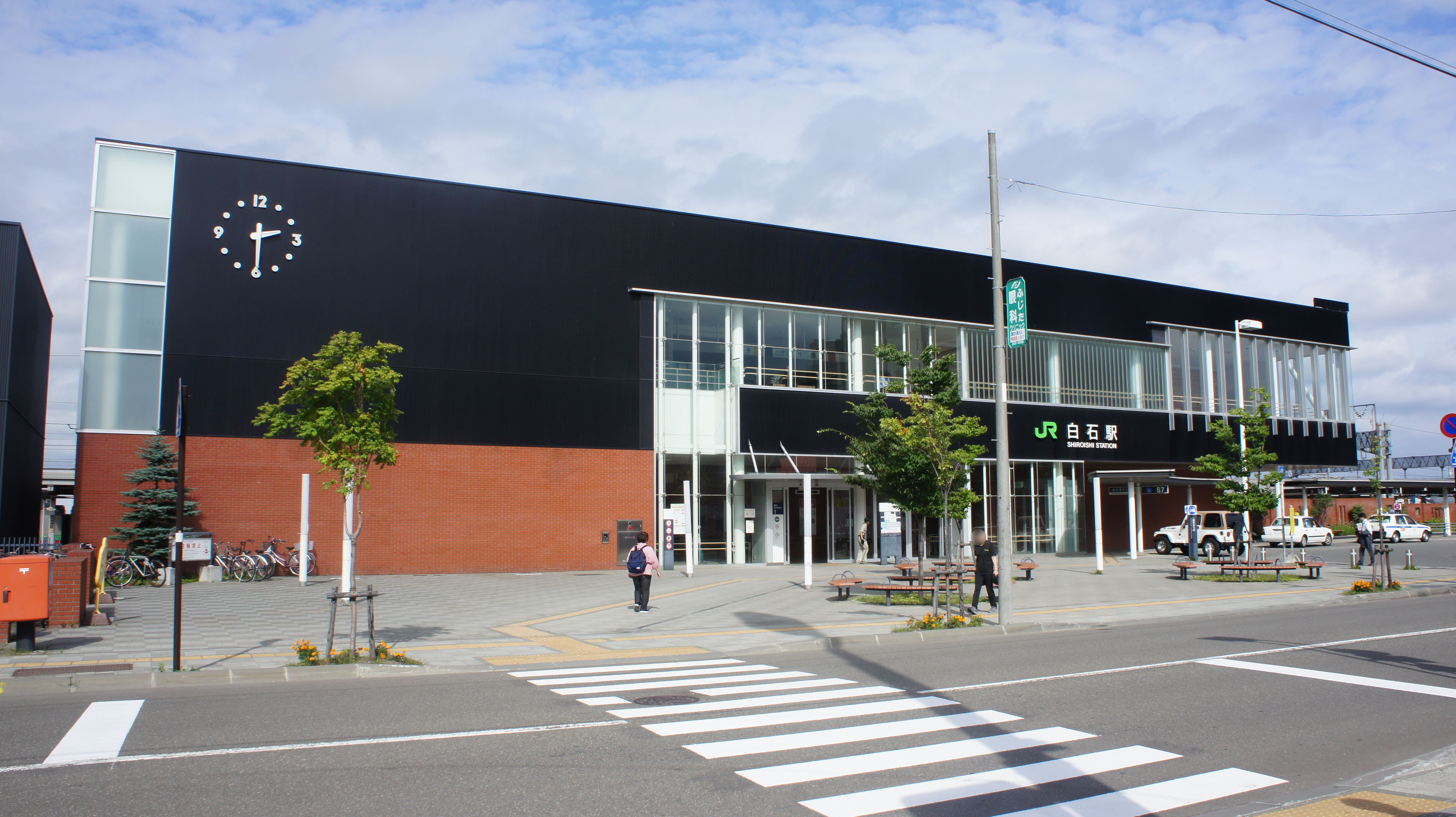
- The south side of Shiroishi Station in September 2018

General information
- Location: Shiroishi-ku, Sapporo, Hokkaido; Japan
- Operator: JR Hokkaido
- Lines: Hakodate Main Line; Chitose Line
- Distance: 292.1 km (181.5 mi) from Hakodate
- Platforms: 2 island platforms
- Tracks: 4
- Connections: Shiroishi Station

Construction
- Structure type: At grade

Other information
- Status: Staffed
- Station code: H03

History
- Opened: 21 April 1903; 123 years ago

Passengers
- FY2015: 7,928 daily

Services
Preceding station	JR Hokkaido	Following station
Heiwa towards Numanohata or New Chitose Airport	Chitose Line Local	Naebo towards Sapporo
Shin-Sapporo towards New Chitose Airport	Rapid Airport	Sapporo towards Otaru
Naebo towards Hakodate	Hakodate Main Line Local	Atsubetsu towards Asahikawa
Other services
Preceding station	JR Hokkaido	Following station
Special Rapid Airport does not stop here
Ōzora does not stop here
Tokachi does not stop here
Location
- Location within Hokkaido Location within Japan

Shiroishi Station (白石駅, Shiroishi-eki) is a railway station in Shiroishi-ku, Sapporo, Hokkaido, Japan, operated by Hokkaido Railway Company (JR Hokkaido). The station is numbered H03.

== Station layout ==
The station consists of two island platforms (platforms 2/3 and 5/6) serving four tracks, with two additional through tracks (tracks 1 and 4). Previously, there was a side platform adjoining track 1, although it was fenced off as it was used only for freight services; this platform was removed during the construction of the current station building (completed in 2011).

The station has automated ticket machines, automated turnstiles which accept Kitaca, and a "Midori no Madoguchi" staffed ticket office.

=== Platforms ===
2	■ Hakodate Main Line	for Sapporo, Teine, and Otaru
3	■ Chitose Line	for Sapporo, Teine, and Otaru
5	■ Chitose Line	for Chitose and Tomakomai
6	■ Hakodate Main Line	for Ebetsu, Iwamizawa, and Takikawa

== Adjacent stations ==
«	Service	»
Hakodate Main Line
Limited Express Sōya: Does not stop at this station
Limited Express Okhotsk: Does not stop at this station
Limited Express Lilac: Does not stop at this station
Limited Express Kamui: Does not stop at this station
Naebo	Semi-Rapid	Ōasa
Naebo	Local	Atsubetsu

== Surrounding area ==
- Sapporo-Shiroishi Bus Terminal
- Sapporo-Shiroishi Post office

== See also ==
- List of railway stations in Japan
