= Heiwa Station =

Railway station in Sapporo, Japan

Coordinates: 43.0467°N 141.4384°E

Heiwa Station 平和駅
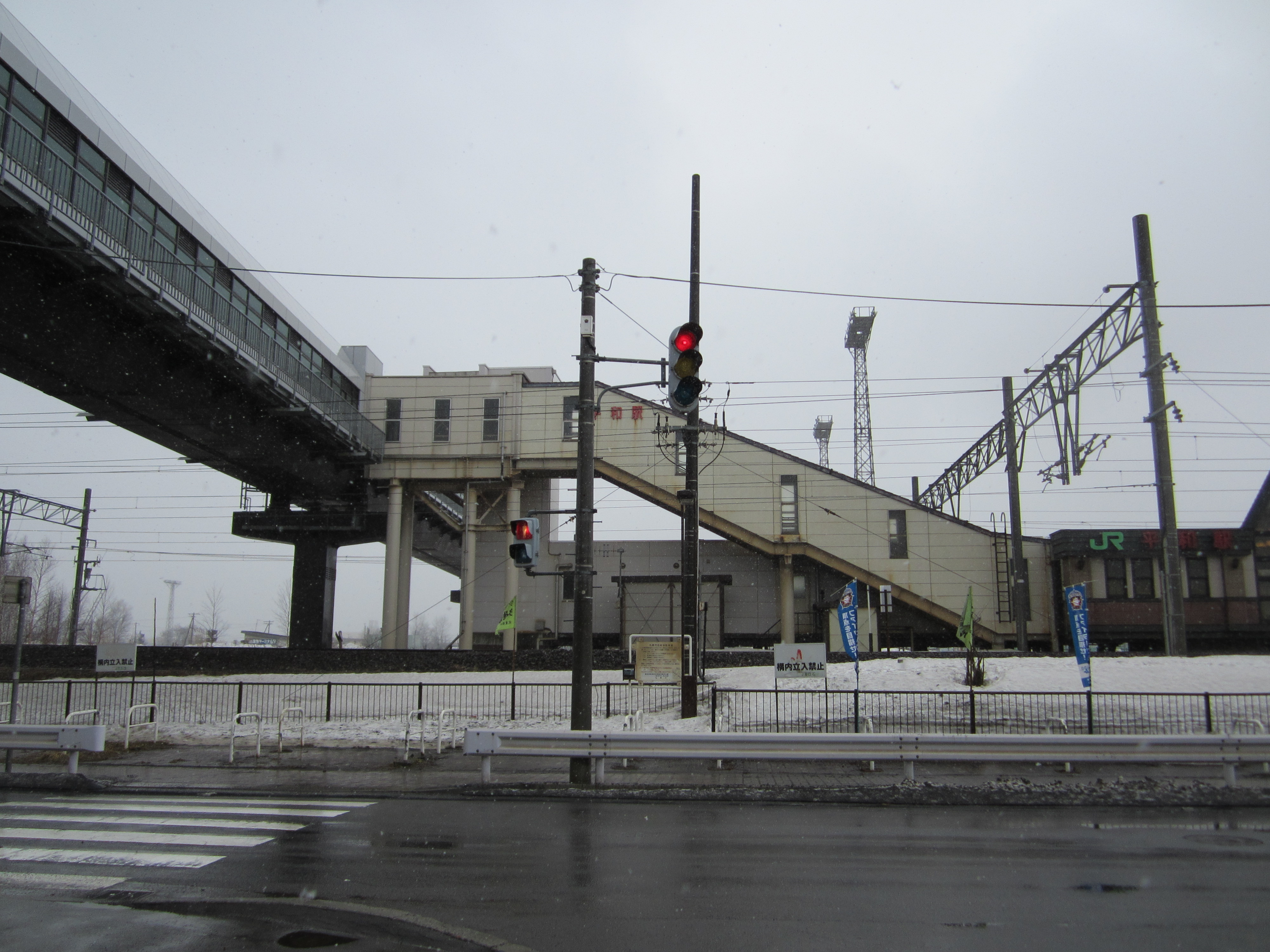

General information
- Location: Shiroishi-ku, Sapporo, Hokkaido; Japan
- Operator: The logo of Hokkaido Railway Company (JR Hokkaido).
- Line: Chitose Line
- Distance: 54.4 km (33.8 mi) from Numanohata
- Platforms: 1 island platform
- Tracks: 2

Other information
- Status: Staffed
- Station code: H04

History
- Opened: 1 November 1986; 39 years ago

Passengers
- FY2014: 2,772 daily

Services
Preceding station	JR Hokkaido	Following station
Shin-Sapporo towards Numanohata or New Chitose Airport	Chitose Line Local	Shiroishi towards Sapporo
Other services
Preceding station	JR Hokkaido	Following station
Ōzora does not stop here
Tokachi does not stop here
Location
- Location within Hokkaido Location within Japan

Heiwa Station (平和駅, Heiwa-eki) is a railway station on the Chitose Line in Shiroishi-ku, Sapporo, Hokkaido, Japan, operated by Hokkaido Railway Company (JR Hokkaido). The station is numbered "H04".

== Lines ==
Heiwa Station is served by Chitose Line.

The tracks of the Hakodate Main Line pass around this station, but the station does not serve them.

== Station layout ==
The station consists of an island platform serving two tracks. The station has automated ticket machines, automated turnstiles which accept Kitaca, and a "Midori no Madoguchi" staffed ticket office.

=== Platforms ===
1	■ Chitose Line	for New Chitose Airport and Tomakomai
2	■ Chitose Line	for Sapporo and Otaru

== Surroundings ==
- National Route 12, (to Asahikawa)
- National Route 274, (to Shibecha)
- Kawashimo Park
- JR Freight Sapporo Freight Terminal
- Kita-Shiraishi Police Station
- Kita-Shiraishi Ni-jo Post Office
- Hokkaido "No more exposure to radiation" Hall, (with Hiroshima & Nagasaki Atomic Bomb Exhibition).
- Sapporo Warehouse complex
- Sapporo Shinkin Bank, Kita branch

== See also ==
- List of railway stations in Japan
