= Kami-Nopporo Station =

Railway station in Sapporo, Japan

Coordinates: 43.0163°N 141.4875°E

Kami-Nopporo Station 上野幌駅
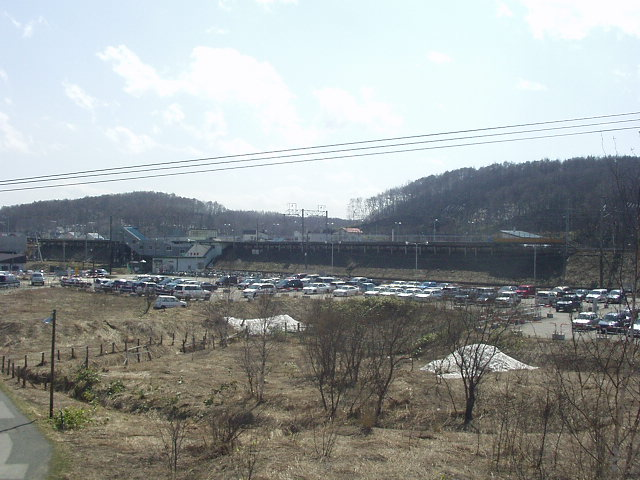

General information
- Location: Atsubetsu, Sapporo; Hokkaido; Japan
- Operator: JR Hokkaido
- Line: Chitose Line
- Platforms: 1 island platform and 1 side platform
- Tracks: 3

Construction
- Structure type: At grade

Other information
- Station code: H06

History
- Opened: 21 August 1926; 100 years ago

Services
Preceding station	JR Hokkaido	Following station
Kitahiroshima towards Numanohata or New Chitose Airport	Chitose Line Local	Shin-Sapporo towards Sapporo
Ōzora does not stop here
Tokachi does not stop here
Suzuran does not stop here
Hokuto does not stop here
Location
- Location within Hokkaido Location within Japan

Kami-Nopporo Station (上野幌駅, Kami-Nopporo-eki) is a railway station of the Chitose Line located in Atsubetsu-ku, Sapporo, Hokkaidō, Japan, operated by Hokkaido Railway Company (JR Hokkaido). The station is numbered H06.

== Lines ==
1	■Chitose Line	for	Kita-Hiroshima・Chitose・Shin-Chitose-Kuko・Tomakomai Area
2	■Chitose Line
3	■Chitose Line	for	Sapporo・Teine・Otaru Area

== Surrounding area ==
- Japan National Route 274, (to Shibecha)
- Sapporo Snow Brand Seed, Horticultural Center
- Sapporo Boeun Gakuen, Social Welfare Corporation
