= Chitose Station (Hokkaido) =

Railway station in Chitose, Hokkaido, Japan

Coordinates: 42.828449°N 141.65175°E

H13 Chitose Station 千歳駅
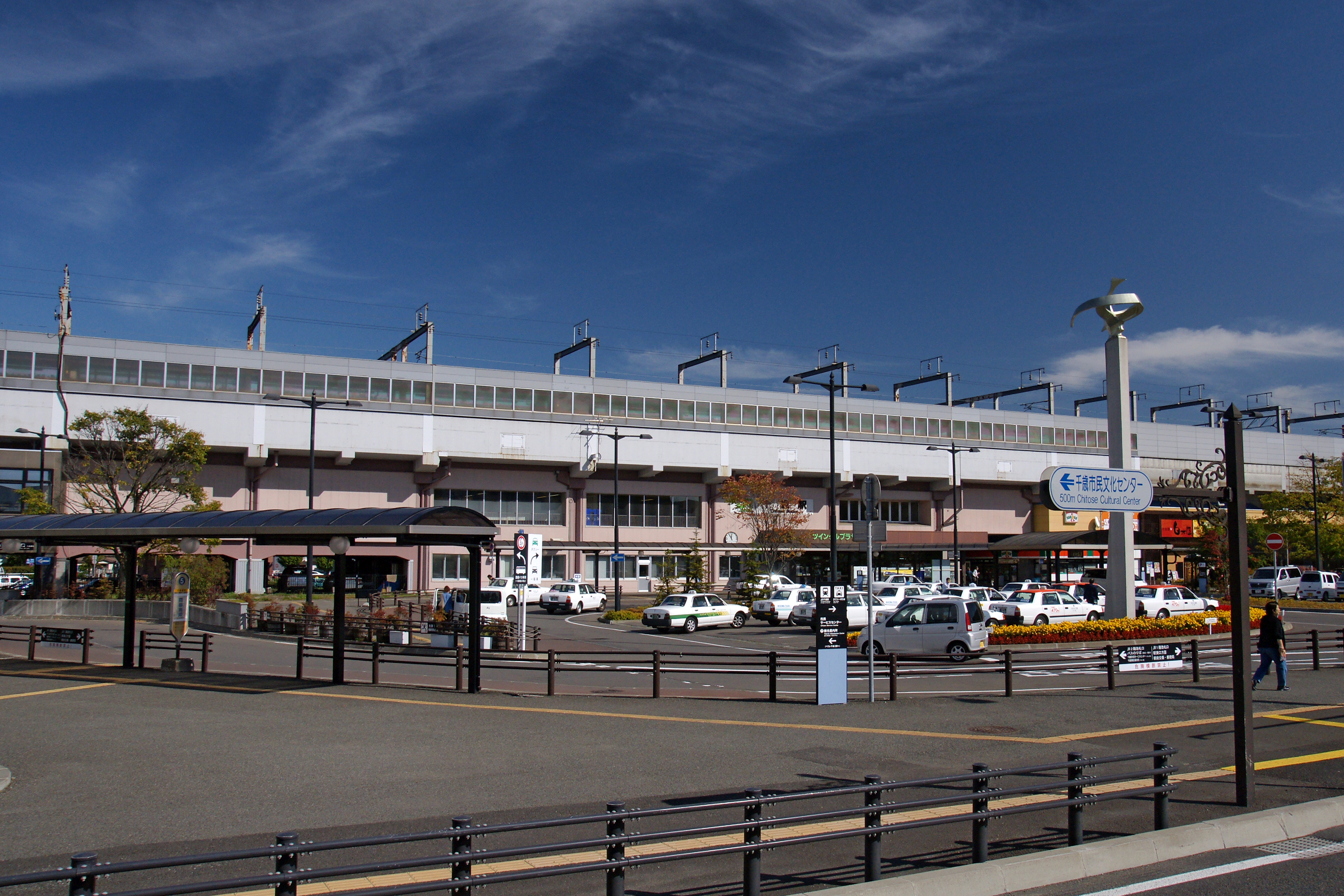
- The west side of Chitose Station, October 2009

General information
- Location: Chitose, Hokkaido; Japan
- Operator: JR Hokkaido
- Line: ■ Chitose Line
- Distance: 21.4 km from Numanohata
- Platforms: 2 island platforms
- Tracks: 4

Other information
- Status: Staffed
- Station code: H13

History
- Opened: August 21, 1926; 100 years ago

Passengers
- FY2015: 8,623 daily

Services
Preceding station	JR Hokkaido	Following station
Minami-Chitose H14 towards Numanohata or New Chitose Airport	Chitose Line Local	Osatsu H12 towards Sapporo
Minami-Chitose H14 towards New Chitose Airport	Semi-Rapid Airport	Osatsu H12 towards Sapporo
Minami-Chitose H14 towards New Chitose Airport	Rapid Airport	Eniwa H10 towards Otaru
Special Rapid Airport does not stop here

Limited Express
Preceding station	JR Hokkaido	Following station
Shin-Sapporo towards Higashi-Muroran	Suzuran	Minami-Chitose towards Sapporo
Ōzora does not stop here
Tokachi does not stop here
Hokuto does not stop here
Location
- Location within Japan

Chitose Station (千歳駅, Chitose Eki) is a railway station on the Chitose Line in Chitose, Hokkaido, Japan, operated by Hokkaido Railway Company (JR Hokkaido).

== Lines ==
Chitose Station is served by the Chitose Line. The station is numbered "H13".

== Station layout ==
The station consists of two elevated island platforms serving four tracks. The station has automated ticket machines, automated turnstiles which accept the Kitaca farecard, and a "Midori no Madoguchi" staffed ticket office.

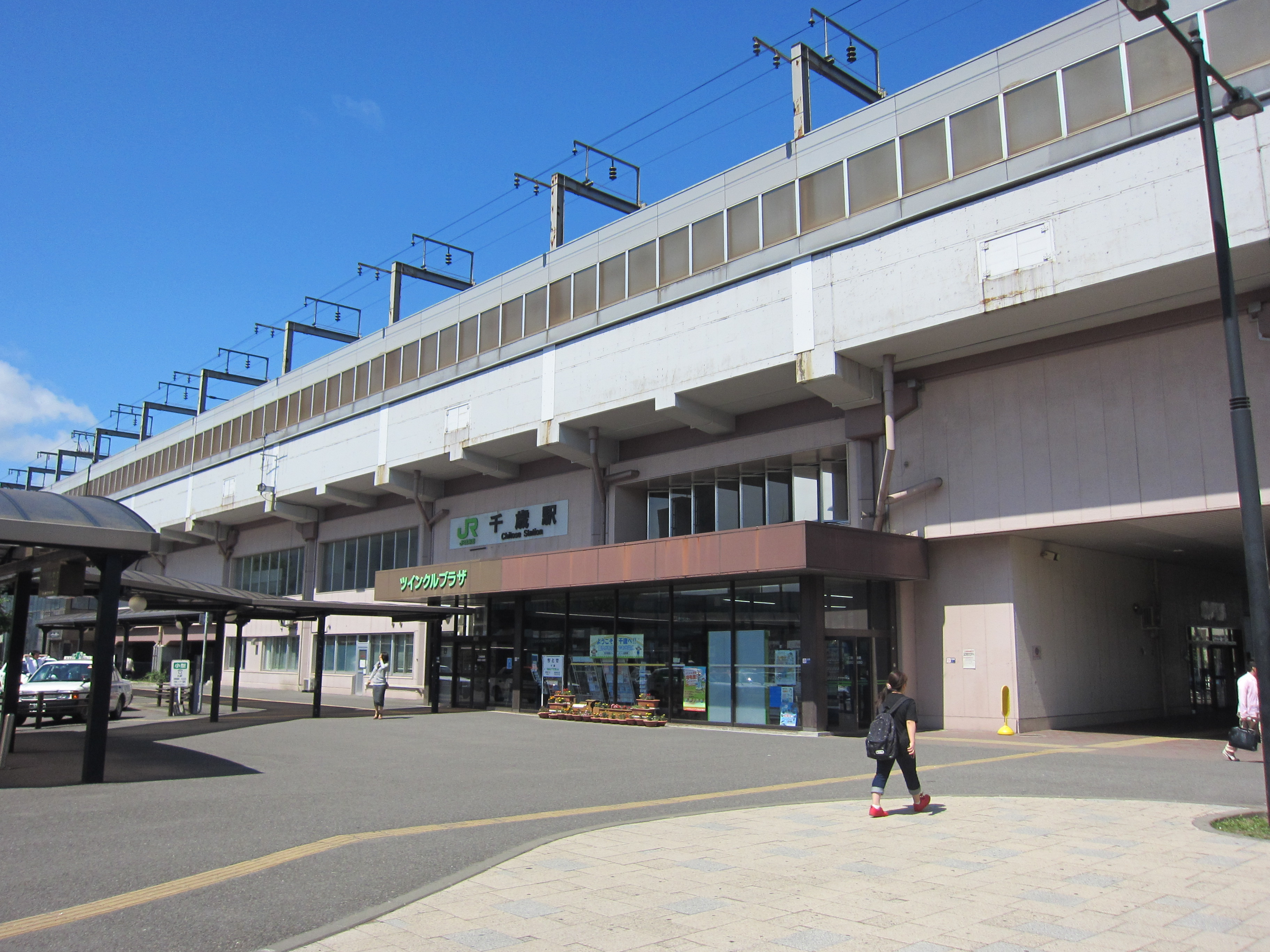
The east side of Chitose Station in July 2014

=== Platforms ===
1	■ Chitose Line	Rapid Airport for New Chitose Airport; Limited express for Tomakomai and Higashi-Muroran
2, 3	■ Chitose Line	Local train for New Chitose Airport and Tomakomai; Local train for Sapporo and Otaru
2, 3	■ Sekishō Line	Local train for Oiwake and Yūbari
4	■ Chitose Line	Rapid Airport/Limited express for Sapporo and Otaru

== Surrounding area ==
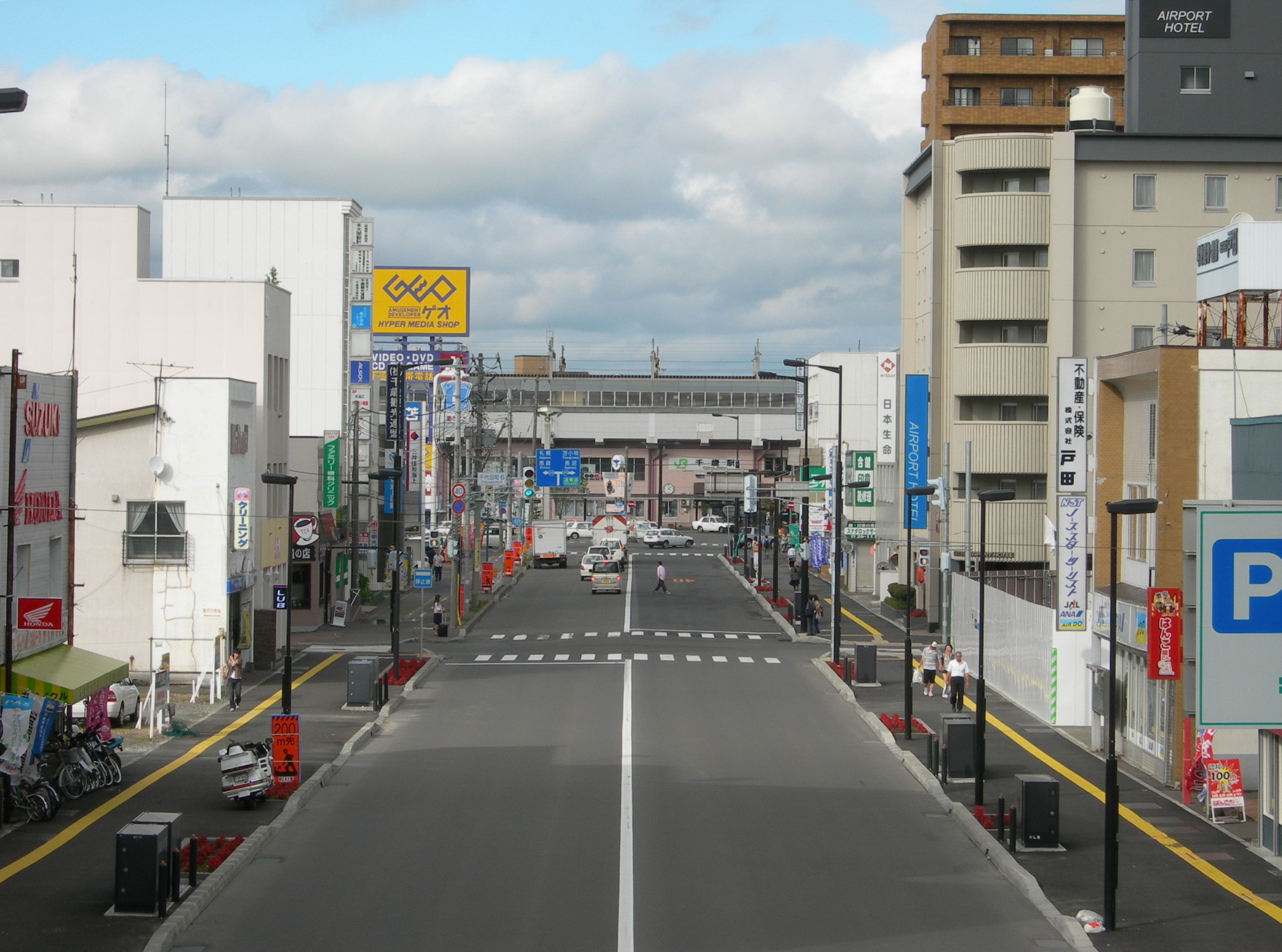
The street in front of Chitose Station in July 2007

- Chitose Post office
- Chitose Police station
- Chitose city office
- Chitose high school

== See also ==
- List of railway stations in Japan
