= Uenae Station =

Railway station in Tomakomai, Hokkaido, Japan

Coordinates: 42.7132°N 141.7351°E

H16 Uenae Station 植苗駅
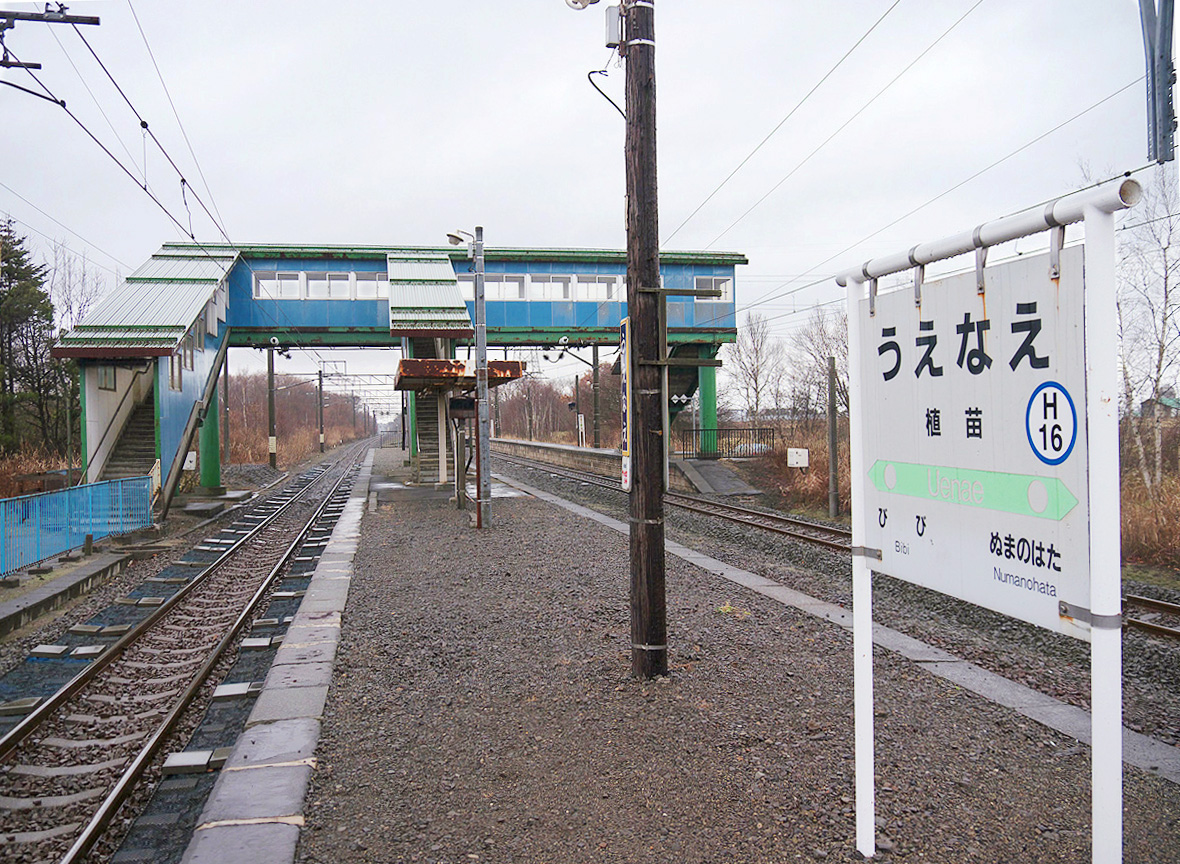
- Platforms, November 2011

General information
- Location: Tomakomai, Hokkaido; Japan
- Operator: JR Hokkaido
- Line: ■ Chitose Line
- Distance: 6.4 km from Numanohata
- Platforms: 2 side platforms
- Tracks: 2

Other information
- Status: Unstaffed
- Station code: H16

History
- Opened: August 21, 1926

Passengers
- FY2012: 29 daily
Location
- Location within Japan

Uenae Station (植苗駅, Uenae-eki) is a railway station on the Chitose Line located in Tomakomai, Hokkaidō, Japan. The station is numbered H16.

== Lines ==
Uenae Station is served by the Muroran Main Line.

== Station layout ==
The station consists of two ground-level side platforms serving two tracks. The station has Kitaca card readers (not equipped with regular ticket gates). The station is unattended, and does not have automated ticket machines.

=== Platforms ===
1	■ Chitose Line	for Tomakomai
2	■ Chitose Line	for Sapporo and Otaru

== Adjacent stations ==
«	Service	»
Chitose Line
Numanohata (H17)	Local	Minami-Chitose (H14)
