= Chitose Line =

Railway line in Hokkaido, Japan

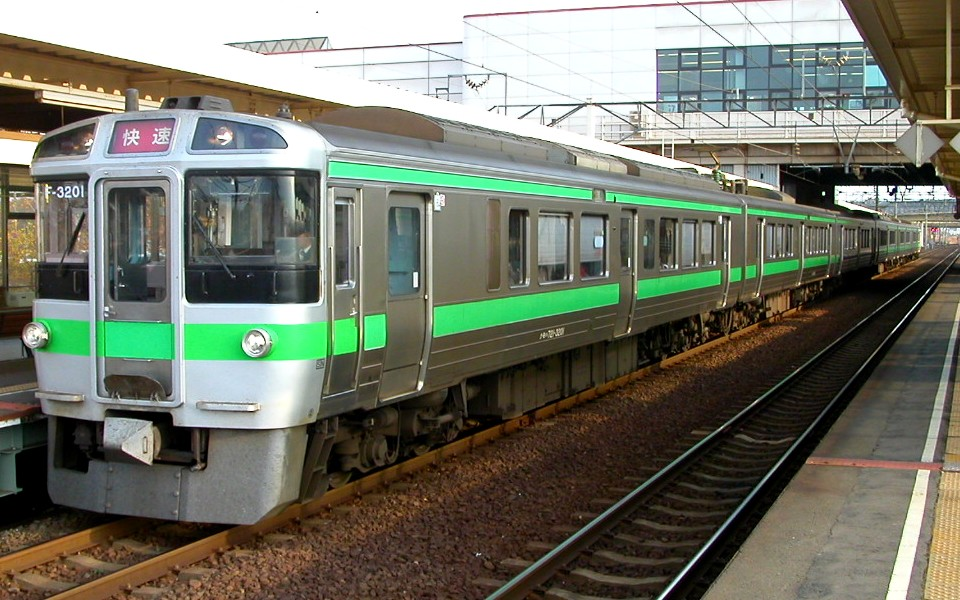
- A 721 series EMU on an Airport rapid service at Minami-Chitose Station

Overview
- Native name: 千歳線
- Owner: JR Hokkaido
- Locale: Hokkaido
- Termini: Numanohata / New Chitose Airport / Minami-Chitose; Sapporo
- Stations: 15

Service
- Type: Airport rail link Commuter rail

History
- Opened: August 21, 1926; 99 years ago

Technical
- Line length: 56.6 km (35.2 mi)
- Number of tracks: Double (except Airport branch which is single)
- Track gauge: 1,067 mm (3 ft 6 in)
- Electrification: AC 20 kV 50 Hz with overhead catenary
Route map

The Chitose Line (千歳線, Chitose-sen) is a railway line in Hokkaido operated by Hokkaido Railway Company (JR Hokkaido), connecting Numanohata, Tomakomai and Shiroishi Station in Shiroishi-ku, Sapporo, linking the Muroran Main Line and Hakodate Main Line. There also is a branch line to New Chitose Airport.

== Service outline ==
The line forms part of the trunk route between Sapporo and Southern Hokkaido. As such, Hokuto limited express trains run between Sapporo and Hakodate once every 1 to 2 hours, as well as the Suzuran limited express between Sapporo and Muroran.

The section between Sapporo and Minami-Chitose is also a part of the trunk route between Sapporo and eastern Hokkaido. The Ōzora and Tokachi limited express services to Obihiro and Kushiro run through.

The rapid trains Special Rapid Airport and Rapid Airport previously ran approximately once every 12 minutes, functioning as the airport rail link between New Chitose Airport Station and Sapporo or Otaru. Since the Chitose Line goes through the most urbanized area in Hokkaido, there are roughly 3 to 4 local train services per hour.

On March 16, 2024, a new rapid service named "Semi-Rapid Airport" plying between Sapporo and New Chitose Airport Station was introduced, operating only during the daytime at two trains per hour. This train stops at Sapporo, Shin-Sapporo and all stations between Kita-Hiroshima and New Chitose Airport. Since then, no local services operate between Kita-Hiroshima and Chitose during the daytime, and the daytime service frequency of other rapid trains was adjusted to one per hour for Special Rapid Airport trains and three per hour for Rapid Airport trains. Local services are operated at two trains per hour between Sapporo and Kita-Hiroshima and one train per hour between Chitose and Tomakomai during the daytime.

=== Former services ===
There were sleeper trains between Honshu and Hokkaido, such as the Hokutosei, Cassiopeia, Twilight Express, and Hamanasu.

== Station list ==
SRA: Special Rapid Airport
RA: Rapid Airport
SmRA: Semi-Rapid Airport
L: Local
All rapid trains stop at stations signed "+", some at "◌", and all skip stations marked "-". Local trains stop at most stations but some skip stations signed "◌".

No.	Station name	Japanese	Distance (km)	SRA	RA	SmRA	L	Transfers	Location (all in Hokkaido)
Tomakomai to Numanohata: officially Muroran Main Line
H18	Tomakomai	苫小牧	-8.8				+	■ Muroran Main Line (for Higashi-Muroran); ■ Hidaka Main Line	Tomakomai
Chitose Line (Main Line)
H17	Numanohata	沼ノ端	0.0				+	■ Muroran Main Line (for Oiwake)	Tomakomai
H16	Uenae	植苗	6.4				◌		Tomakomai
H14	Minami-Chitose	南千歳	18.4	+	+	+	+	■ Airport Branch Line; ■ Sekishō Line	Chitose
H13	Chitose	千歳	21.4	-	+	+	+		Chitose
H12	Osatsu	長都	24.9	-	-	+	+		Chitose
H11	Sapporo Beer Teien	サッポロビール庭園	27.1	-	-	+	◌		Eniwa
H10	Eniwa	恵庭	29.4	-	+	+	+		Eniwa
H09	Megumino	恵み野	31.9	-	-	+	+		Eniwa
H08	Shimamatsu	島松	34.1	-	-	+	+		Eniwa
H07	Kitahiroshima	北広島	40.6	-	+	+	+		Kitahiroshima
H06	Kami-Nopporo	上野幌	48.6	-	-	-	+		Atsubetsu-ku, Sapporo
H05	Shin-Sapporo	新札幌	51.5	+	+	+	+	Tōzai Line ( T19 )	Atsubetsu-ku, Sapporo
H04	Heiwa	平和	54.4	-	-	-	+		Shiroishi-ku, Sapporo
Shiroishi to Sapporo: officially Hakodate Main Line
H03	Shiroishi	白石	56.6	-	◌	-	+	■ Hakodate Main Line (for Asahikawa)	Shiroishi-ku, Sapporo
H02	Naebo	苗穂	60.2	-	-	-	+		Chūō-ku, Sapporo
01	Sapporo	札幌	62.4	+	+	+	+	■ Hakodate Main Line (for Otaru); ■ Sasshō Line (Gakuentoshi Line); Namboku Line ( N06 ); Tōhō Line ( H07 ); Hokkaido Shinkansen (planned)	Kita-ku, Sapporo

=== Airport Branch Line ===
No.	Station name	Japanese	Distance (km)	SRA	RA	SmRA	L	Transfers	Location (all in Hokkaido)
H14	Minami-Chitose	南千歳	0.0	+	+	+	+	Chitose Line (Main Line); ■ Sekishō Line	Chitose
AP15	New Chitose Airport	新千歳空港	2.6	+	+	+	+		Chitose

=== Closed station ===
- H15 Bibi: Closed since March 4, 2017, now a signal base.

== Rolling stock ==
- 721 series EMUs
- 731 series EMUs
- 733 series EMUs
- 735 series EMUs
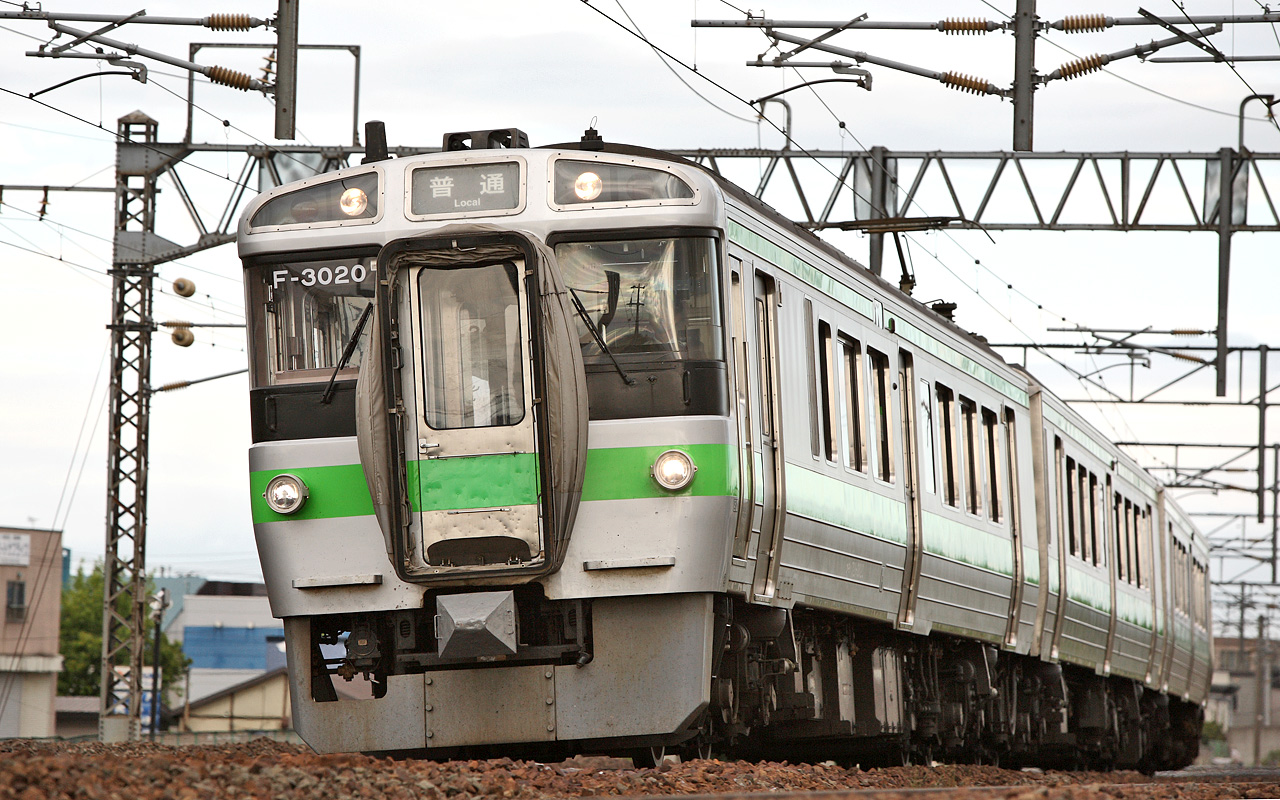
A 721 series EMU on the Chitose Line, June 2008

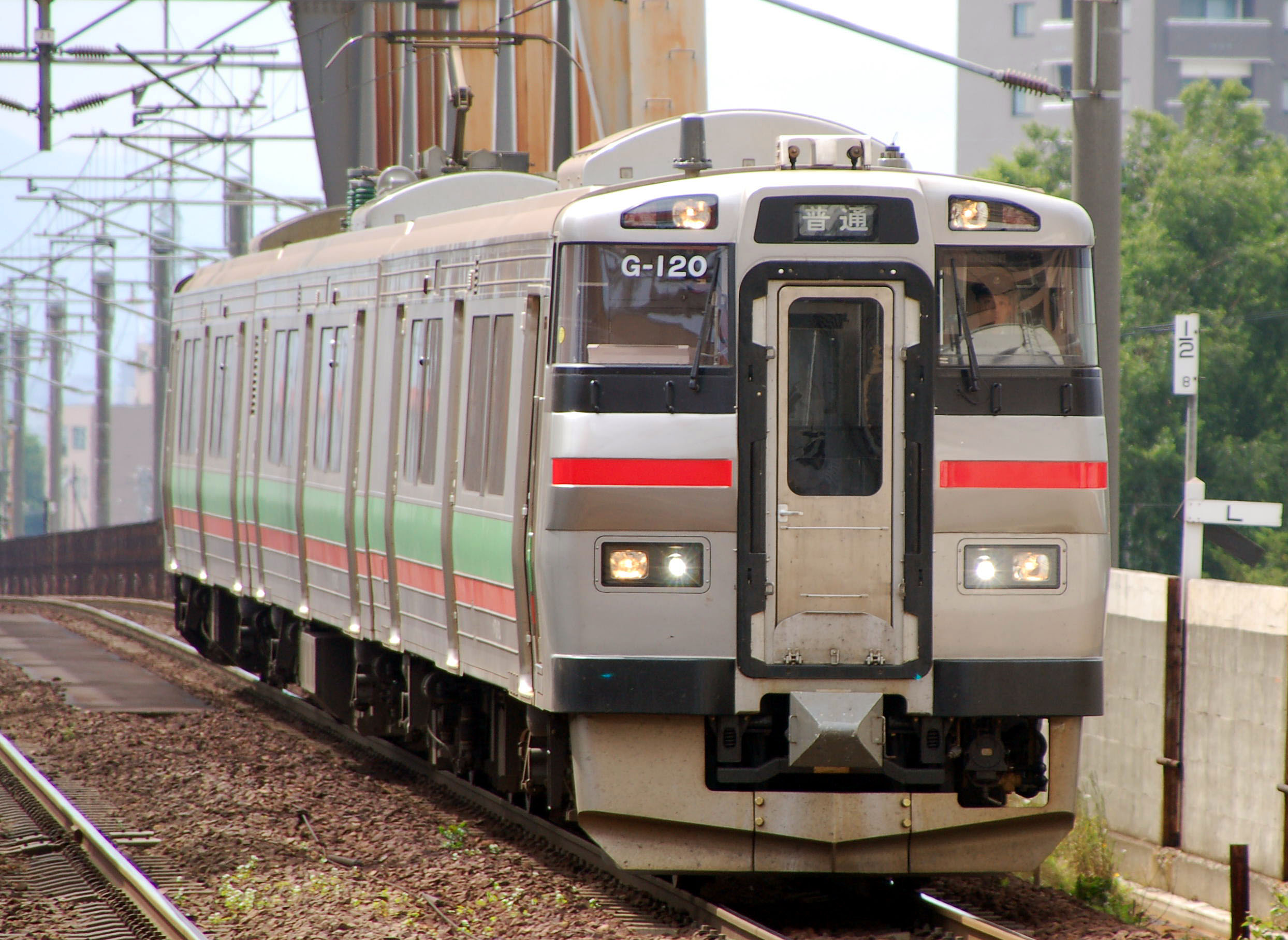
A 731 series EMU on the Chitose Line, July 2006

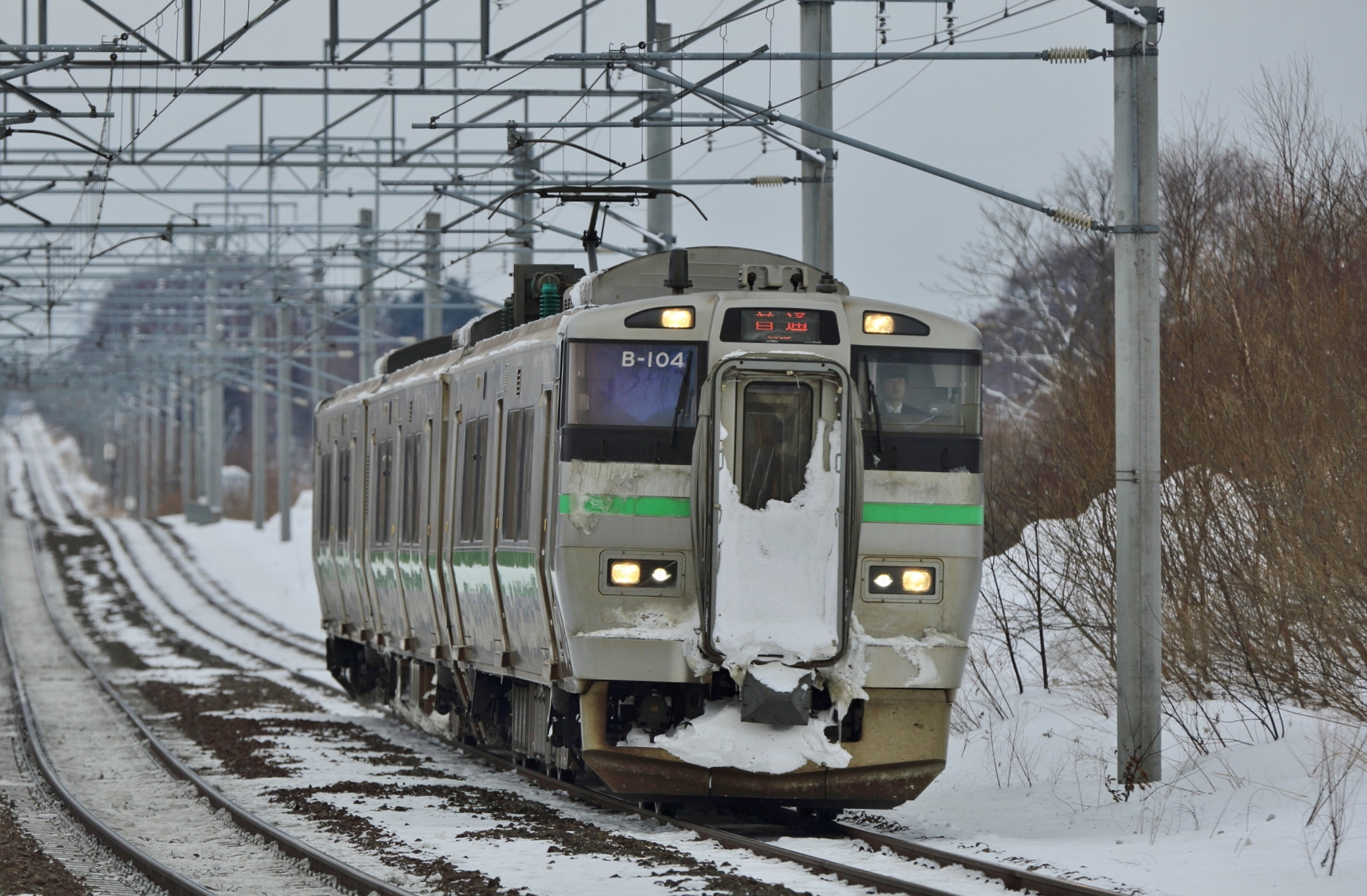
A 733 series EMU on the Chitose Line, February 2014

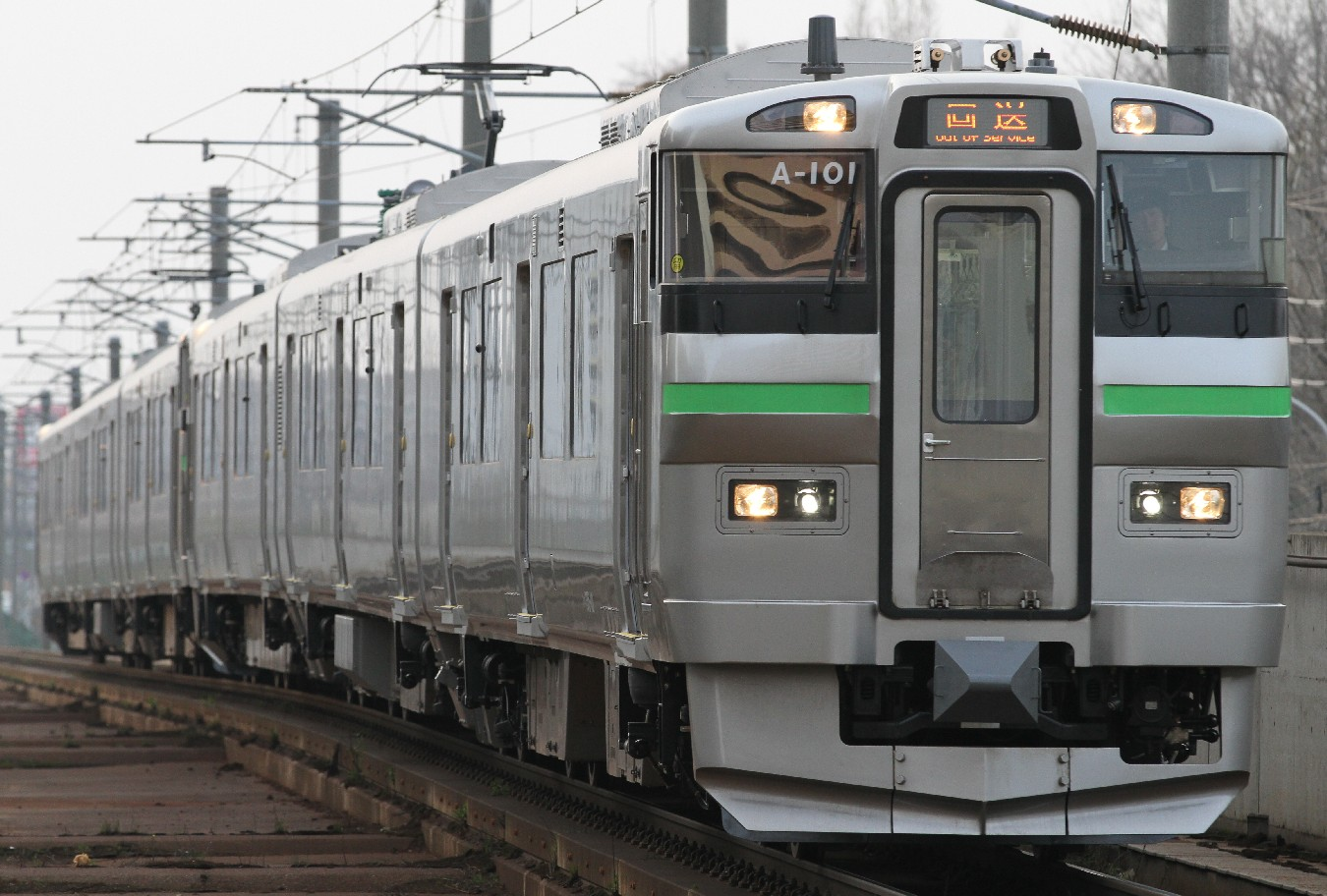
735 series EMUs, May 2012

== History ==
The entire line opened on August 21, 1926.

=== Duplication ===
The Chitose-Eniwa section was double-tracked in September 1965, and extended to Kitahiroshima in September 1966.

The Chitose-Uenae section was double-tracked in 1968, and extended to Numanohata in 1969.

The Shiraishi-Kitahiroshima section was double-tracked in 1973, completing the work to double-track the line.

=== Electrification ===
Chitose Station and its approaches were elevated in 1980, and the line was electrified in association with the opening of the nearby Chitose airport.

The Minami-chitose—Chitose Airport branch opened as an electrified line in 1992.

== See also ==
- Hakodate Main Line
- Muroran Main Line
- Airport rail link
- List of railway lines in Japan
