= Minami-Chitose Station =

Railway station in Chitose, Hokkaido, Japan

Coordinates: 42°48′29.3″N 141°40′31″E

H14 Minami-Chitose Station 南千歳駅
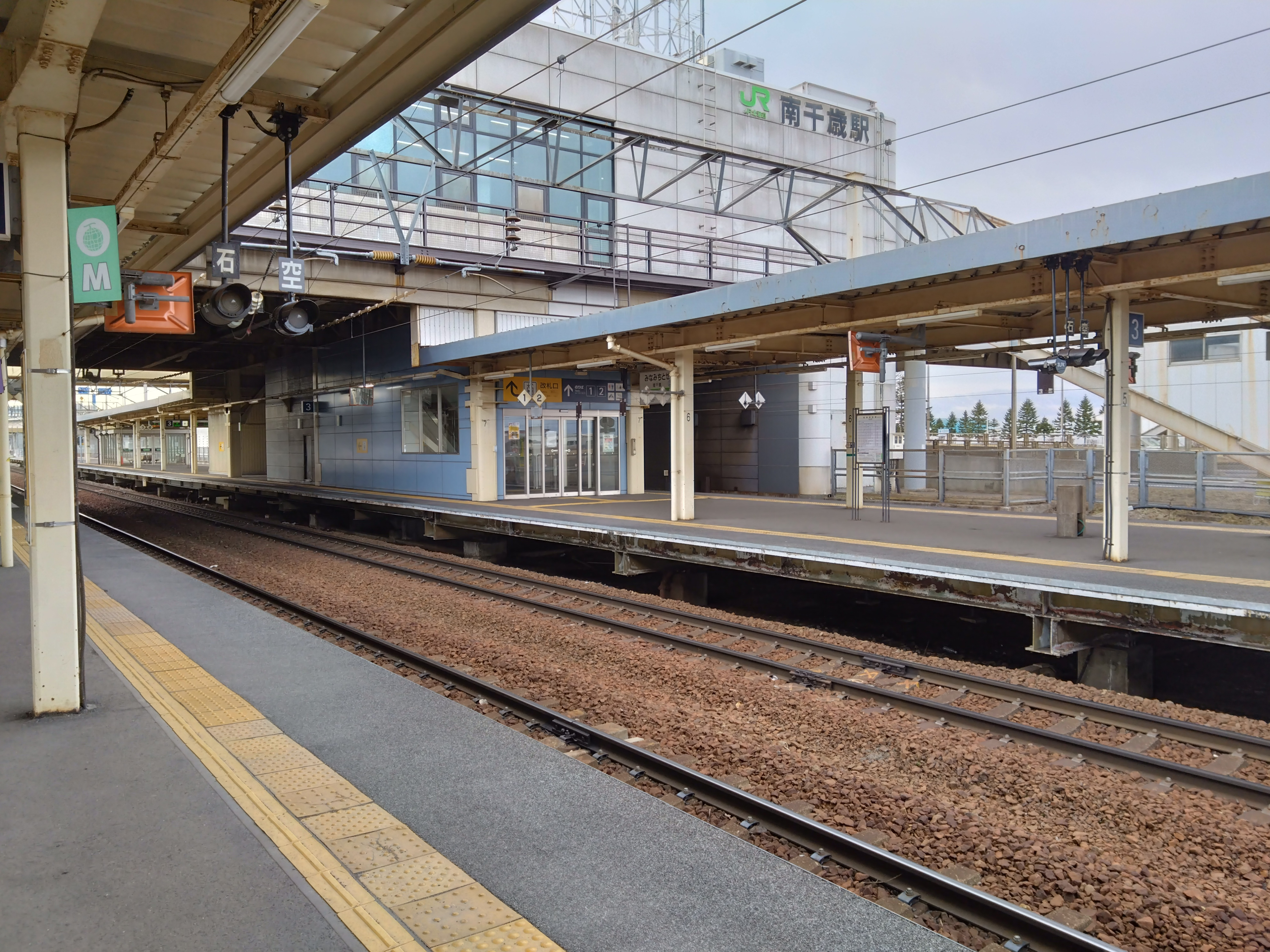
- Minami-Chitose Station platforms in March 2025

General information
- Location: Chitose, Hokkaido; Japan
- Operator: JR Hokkaido
- Lines: Chitose Line; Chitose Line – Airport branch; Sekishō Line
- Distance: 18.4 km (11.4 mi) from Numanohata
- Platforms: 2 island platforms
- Tracks: 4

Construction
- Structure type: At grade

Other information
- Status: Staffed
- Station code: H14

History
- Opened: October 1, 1980; 45 years ago

Passengers
- FY2012: 1,460 daily
Location
- Location within Hokkaido Location within Japan

Minami-Chitose Station (南千歳駅, Minami-chitose-eki) is a railway station in Chitose, Hokkaido, Japan, operated by Hokkaido Railway Company (JR Hokkaido).

== Lines ==
Minami-Chitose Station is served by the Chitose Line and Sekishō Line. The station is numbered "H14".

=== Limited express trains ===
- Ōzora (Sapporo – Kushiro)
- Tokachi (Sapporo – Obihiro)
- Hokuto (Sapporo – Hakodate)
- Suzuran (Sapporo – Muroran)

== Station layout ==
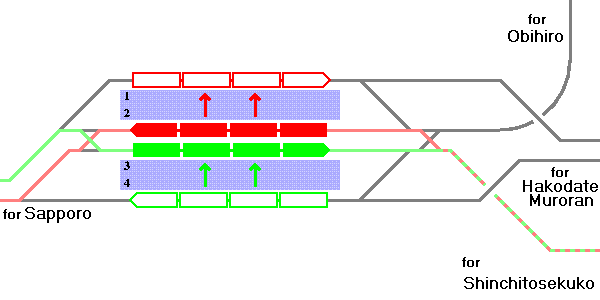
Cross-platform interchange at Minami-Chitose Station

The station consists of two island platforms serving four tracks, with the station situated above the tracks. The station has automated ticket machines, automated turnstiles which accept Kitaca, and a "Midori no Madoguchi" staffed ticket office.

=== Platforms ===
1	■ Chitose Line	for Tomakomai and Higashi-Muroran
1	■ Chitose Line Airport branch	for New Chitose Airport
1	■ Sekishō Line	for Oiwake, Yūbari, and Obihiro
2	■ Chitose Line	for Sapporo and Otaru
2	■ Chitose Line Airport branch	for New Chitose Airport
2	■ Sekishō Line	for Oiwake
3	■ Chitose Line	for Sapporo and Otaru
3	■ Chitose Line Airport branch	for New Chitose Airport
4	■ Chitose Line	for Sapporo and Otaru

== Adjacent stations ==
Preceding station	JR Hokkaido	Following station
Chitose Line
Uenae towards Numanohata or New Chitose Airport	Chitose Line Local	Chitose towards Sapporo
Chitose Line (Airport Branch)
New Chitose Airport Terminus	Chitose Line Airport branch	Chitose towards Sapporo
New Chitose Airport Terminus	Semi-Rapid Airport	Chitose towards Sapporo
New Chitose Airport Terminus	Rapid Airport	Chitose towards Otaru
New Chitose Airport Terminus	Special Rapid Airport	Shin-Sapporo towards Otaru
Limited Express
Shin-Sapporo towards Sapporo	Tokachi	Oiwake towards Obihiro
Shin-Sapporo towards Sapporo	Ōzora	Oiwake towards Kushiro
Tomakomai towards Hakodate	Hokuto	Shin-Sapporo towards Sapporo
