= Kitaca =

Smart card ticketing system used in Hokkaido, Japan

- Normal unregistered Kitaca (on top) and the debut commemorative Kitaca (on bottom)
- Location: Usable nationwide Distributed in Hokkaido
- Launched: October 25, 2008 (17 years ago)
- Operator: Hokkaido Railway Company
- Manager: Hokkaido Railway Company
- Currency: Japanese yen
- Stored-value: Pay as you go
- Auto recharge: None
- Unlimited use: None (Other non-related unlimited use passes available)
- Validity: JR Hokkaido; Sapporo Municipal Subway; Sapporo Streetcar; Hokkaido Chuo Bus; Valid areas of Suica, PASMO, manaca, TOICA, ICOCA, PiTaPa, SUGOCA, Hayakaken, nimoca
- Website: www.jrhokkaido.co.jp/global/english/ticket/kitaca/index.html

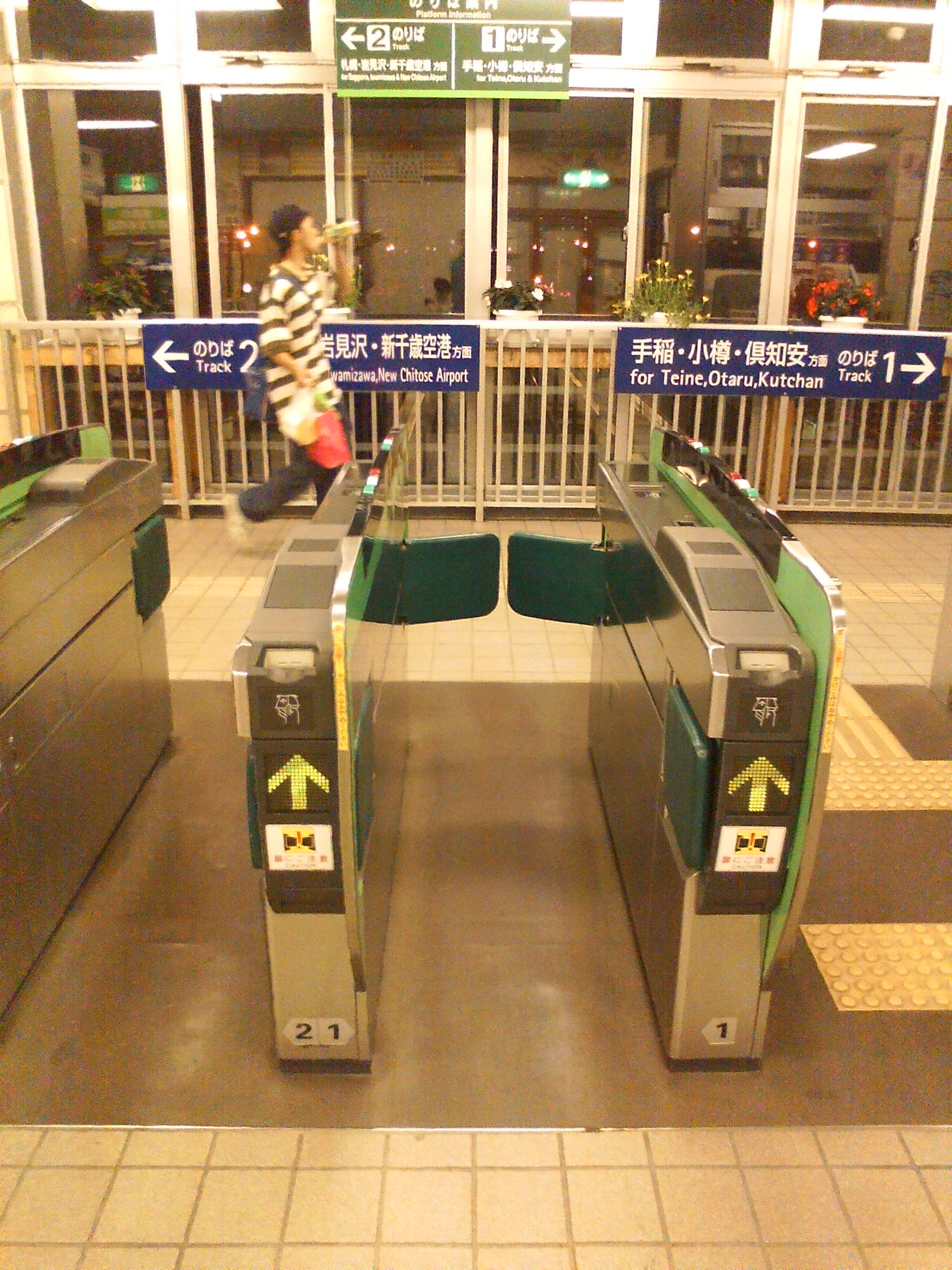
Ticket gates with Kitaca readers at Hassamu-Chūō Station, Sapporo

Kitaca (Japanese: キタカ, romanized: Kitaka) is a rechargeable contactless smart card ticketing system for public transport in Sapporo, Japan. It launched on October 25, 2008 and is managed by Hokkaido Railway Company. The card's name is a combination of the word for "north" (北, kita) and the English loanword "card". 北 is also the first character of Hokkaidō (北海道). Like other electronic fare collection systems in Japan, the card uses RFID technology developed by Sony corporation known as FeliCa. The card's mascot is an ezo momonga (Pteromys volans orii), a type of flying squirrel found in Hokkaidō, and was designed by Sora, an illustrator who lives in Sapporo.

As of end August 2022, the number of cards issued was approximately 1.96 million.

== Usable area ==
As of March 2024, 69 stations in the Sapporo-Asahikawa area, as well as 6 stations in the Hakodate area including unstaffed stations, accept Kitaca on the following lines.

- Hakodate Main Line: From Hakodate to Shin-Hakodate-Hokuto and from Otaru to Asahikawa
- Chitose Line: From Shiroishi to Numanohata, and branch from Minami-Chitose to New Chitose Airport (the whole line)
- Muroran Main Line: From Numanohata to Tomakomai
- Sasshō Line (Gakuentoshi Line): From Sōen to Hokkaidō-Iryōdaigaku (the whole line)

== Types of cards ==
- Unregistered Kitaca
- Registered Kitaca: Requires registration. The card can be reissued when lost.
- Kitaca commuter pass: Requires registration.

Credit card function is also considered. North Pacific Bank, the largest local bank of Hokkaido, considers to include Kitaca's functions to its credit card Clover. A plan to introduce an Osaifu-Keitai compliant mobile payment system was cancelled due to the cost.

== Integration ==
Interoperation map

In 2009, Kitaca became interchangeable with JR East's Suica, including its use of electronic money functionality. Since late 2012, the card can also be used in lieu of a SAPICA, a smart card system introduced in 2009 by the Sapporo City Transportation Bureau.

In 2013, interoperation was extended country-wide, and Kitaca became usable in all major cities across Japan as part of the Nationwide Mutual Usage Service.
