= Numanohata Station =

Railway station in Tomakomai, Hokkaido, Japan

Coordinates: 42.67215°N 141.693420°E

H17 Numanohata Station 沼ノ端駅
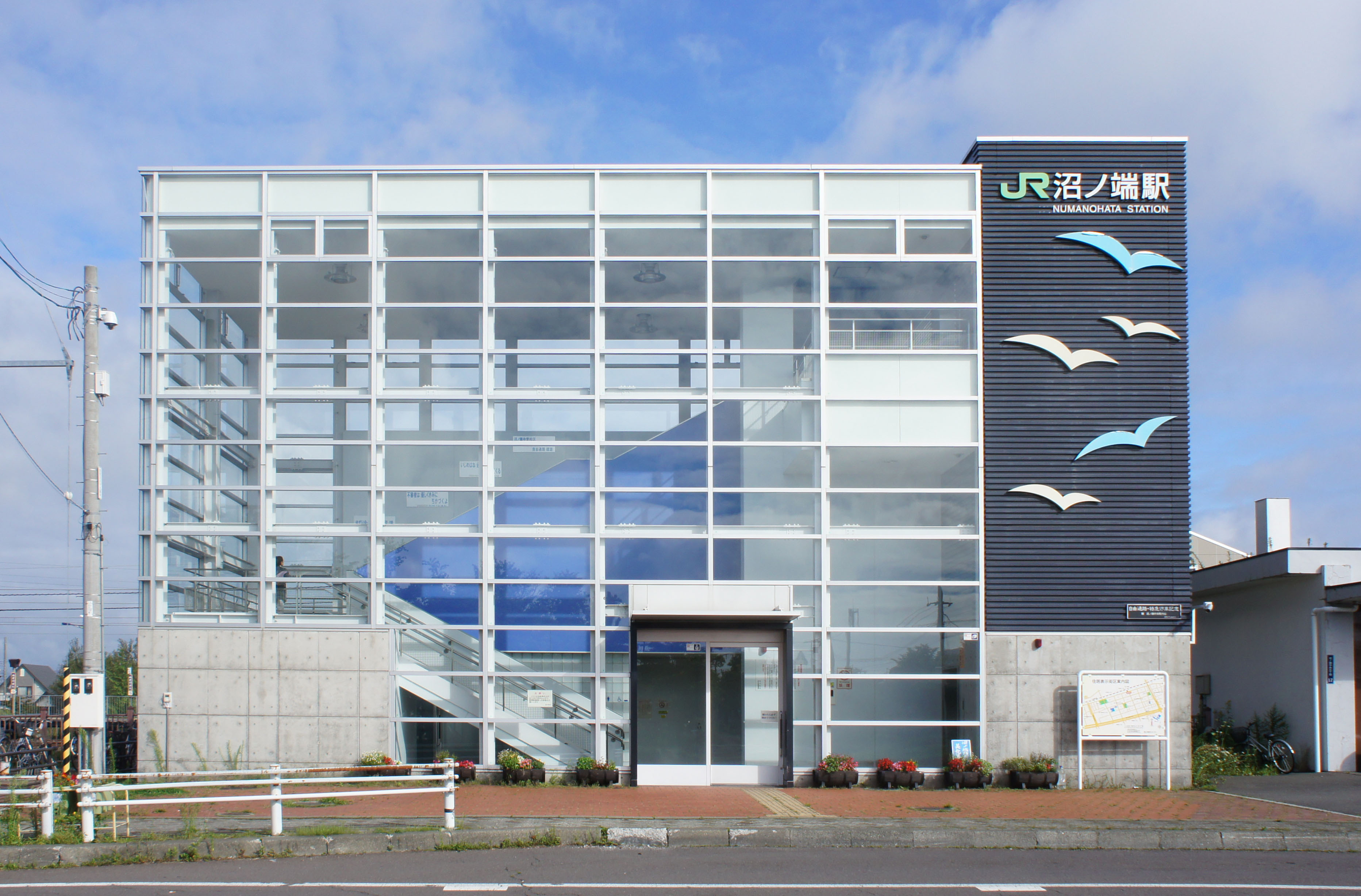
- The station building in September 2018

General information
- Location: Tomakomai, Hokkaido; Japan
- Operator: JR Hokkaido
- Lines: Muroran Main Line; Chitose Line
- Distance: 144.0 km (89.5 mi) from Oshamambe
- Platforms: 1 side + 1 island platforms
- Tracks: 3

Construction
- Structure type: At grade

Other information
- Status: Unstaffed
- Station code: H17

History
- Opened: 1 February 1898; 128 years ago

Passengers
- FY2012: 502 daily

Services
Preceding station	JR Hokkaido	Following station
Tomakomai towards Oshamambe	Muroran Main Line Local	Toasa towards Iwamizawa
Terminus	Chitose Line Local	Uenae towards Sapporo
Limited Express
Tomakomai towards Higashi-Muroran	Suzuran	Minami-Chitose towards Sapporo
Location
- Location within Hokkaido Location within Japan

Numanohata Station (沼ノ端駅, Numanohata-eki) is a railway station on the Chitose Line and Muroran Main Line in Tomakomai, Hokkaido, Japan, operated by Hokkaido Railway Company (JR Hokkaido). The station is numbered "H17".

== Lines ==
This station serves the Muroran Main and Chitose Lines. It is officially the terminus of the Chitose Line, although all trains terminate at Tomakomai Station.

== Station layout ==
The station consists of one side platform and one island platform serving a total of three tracks. The station has automated ticket machines and Kitaca card readers (not equipped with regular ticket gates). The station is unattended.

=== Platforms ===
1	■ Muroran Main Line	for Tomakomai and Higashi-Muroran
2	■ Muroran Main Line	for Tomakomai
3	■ Chitose Line	for Sapporo and Otaru
3	■ Muroran Main Line	for Oiwake and Iwamizawa

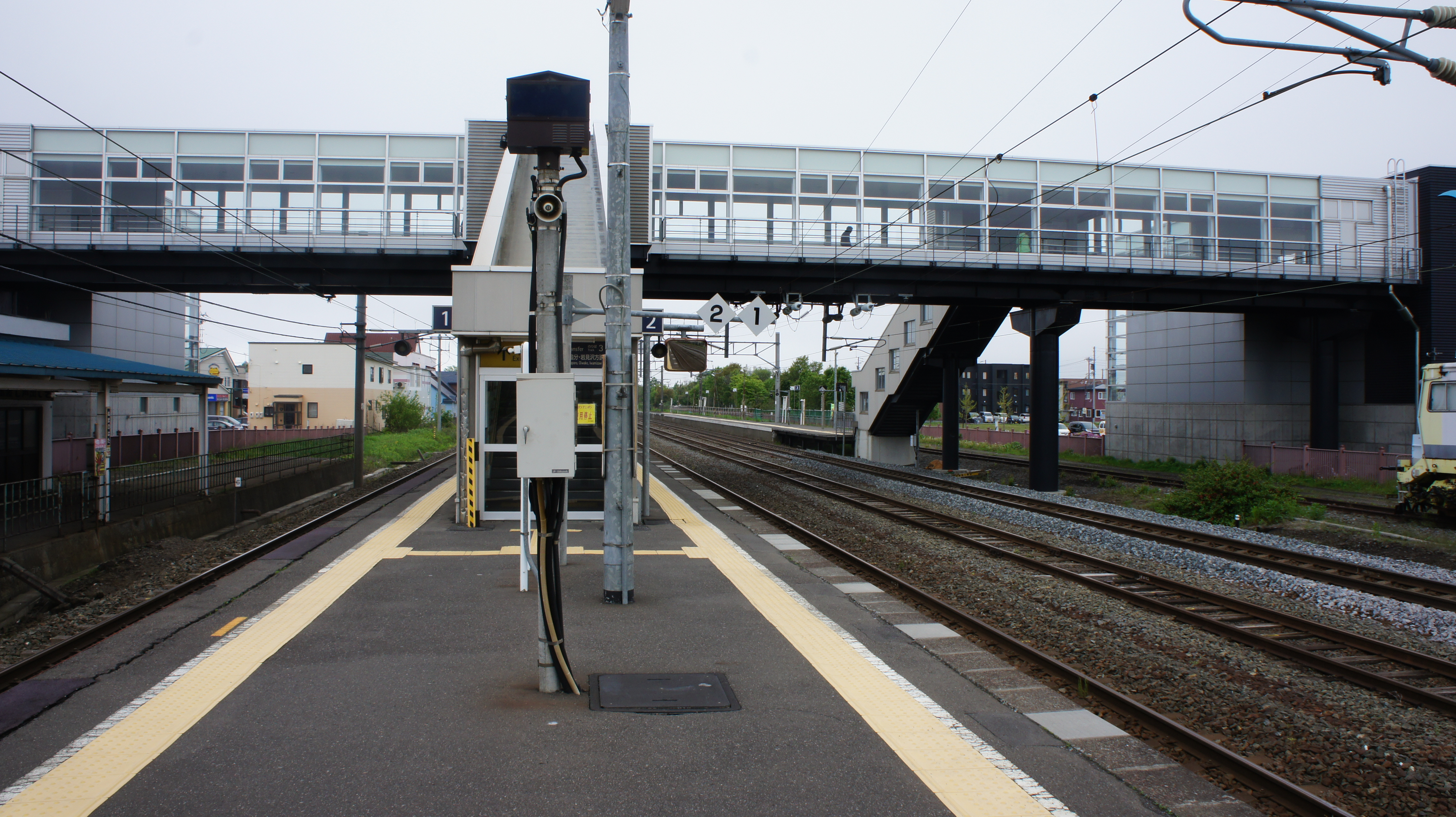
The platforms

== History ==
The station opened on 1 February 1898.

== See also ==
- List of railway stations in Japan
