= New Chitose Airport Station =

Railway station in Chitose, Hokkaido, Japan

Coordinates: 42°47′15.2″N 141°40′50.9″E

AP15 New Chitose Airport Station 新千歳空港駅
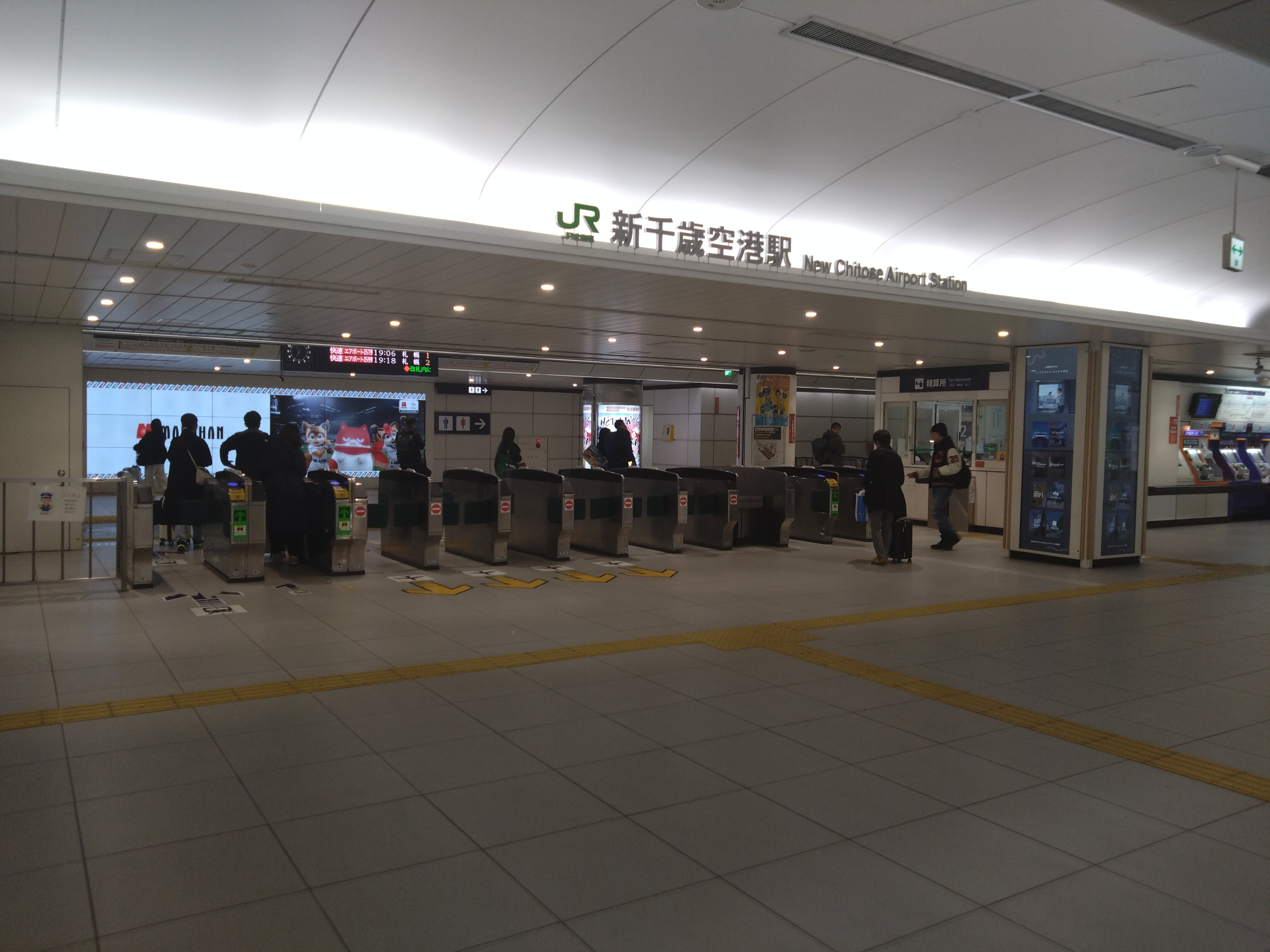
- Ticket gates in 2025

General information
- Location: Bibi, Chitose; Hokkaido Prefecture; Japan
- Operator: JR Hokkaido
- Line: Chitose Line – Airport branch
- Platforms: 1 island platform
- Tracks: 2
- Connections: New Chitose Airport

Construction
- Structure type: Underground

Other information
- Station code: AP15
- IATA code: CTS

History
- Opened: July 1, 1992; 34 years ago

Services
Preceding station	JR Hokkaido	Following station
Terminus	Chitose Line Airport branch	Minami-Chitose H14 towards Sapporo
Terminus	Special Rapid Airport	Minami-Chitose H14 towards Otaru
Terminus	Rapid Airport	Minami-Chitose H14 towards Otaru
Terminus	Semi-Rapid Airport	Minami-Chitose H14 towards Sapporo
Location
- Location within Hokkaido Location within Japan

New Chitose Airport Station (新千歳空港駅, Shin-Chitose Kūkō Eki) is a railway station of Hokkaido Railway Company (JR Hokkaido). It is located beneath the Domestic Terminal building of New Chitose Airport in Chitose, Hokkaido, Japan, and is both the northernmost and easternmost railway station in Japan which is connected to an airport. It is also the easternmost underground railway station in Japan.

== History ==
In February 1983, (Showa 58) Transport Minister Shun Hasegawa announced part of the plan for the railway extension to New Chitose Airport. By 1985, during the formulation of the basic plan for New Chitose Airport, a connecting railway was considered. However, due to resistance from Japan National Railways (JNR) ahead of its privatization, the route was not decided. On November 6, 1987, JR Hokkaido applied to the Minister of Transport for a project license for a 2.5 km section between Chitose Airport Station and New Chitose Airport, marking the first new line construction application by a JR group company after the privatization of JNR.

In 1988, the construction of the branch line between Chitose Airport Station and New Chitose Airport began on September 26. In October, to reduce construction costs, the plan to build the underground branch line using the shield tunneling method was changed to an open-cut method. The two connecting taxiways directly above the route were dug up one at a time to maintain airport operations. In January 1991, the interior design was decided to be a collaborative project with Danish National Railways.

In 1992, the Ministry of Transport was petitioned for a 140 yen surcharge for the branch line fare between Chitose Airport Station and New Chitose Airport on March 16. The station name for the new terminal at New Chitose Airport was also decided to be "New Chitose Airport." On March 25, the Ministry of Transport's Transport Council approved the surcharge for the New Chitose Airport Station branch line. On July 1, the opening of the New Chitose Airport Terminal coincided with the station's opening. At the same time, Chitose Airport Station was renamed to Minami-Chitose Station.

In 1994, the station and its artwork received the 5th Brunel Award for Commendations. On November 21, 1998, automatic ticket gates were introduced. In 2005, a foreigner information desk was established on June 1, and on October 1, a sister station agreement was signed with Narita Airport Station of East Japan Railway Company (JR East). On October 1, 2007, station numbering was implemented (AP15), and on October 25, 2008, the IC card Kitaca began to be used. On March 14, 2009, Kitaca and Suica cards were made mutually compatible.

In June 2015, the kiosk inside the platform closed. In 2018, the kiosks inside the concourse and waiting area closed on March 11. On September 4, the renovation of the "Midori no Madoguchi" (Green Kiosk) and the foreigner information desk was completed. By December 26, a large-scale station interior renovation was completed, including the expansion of the ticket gates and the opening of a new waiting area. Finally, on October 1, 2019, a fare revision was implemented, and the surcharge for the New Chitose Airport branch line was reduced to 20 yen.

== Station layout ==
=== Platform ===
No.	Route	Destination
1	Chitose Line	To Sapporo, Otaru
2	Chitose Line	To Sapporo, Otaru

（Source：JR Hokkaido: Station Information Search）

== See also ==
- List of railway stations in Japan
