= Otaru Station =

Railway station in Hokkaido, Japan

Coordinates: 43°11′52″N 140°59′38″E

S15 Otaru Station 小樽駅
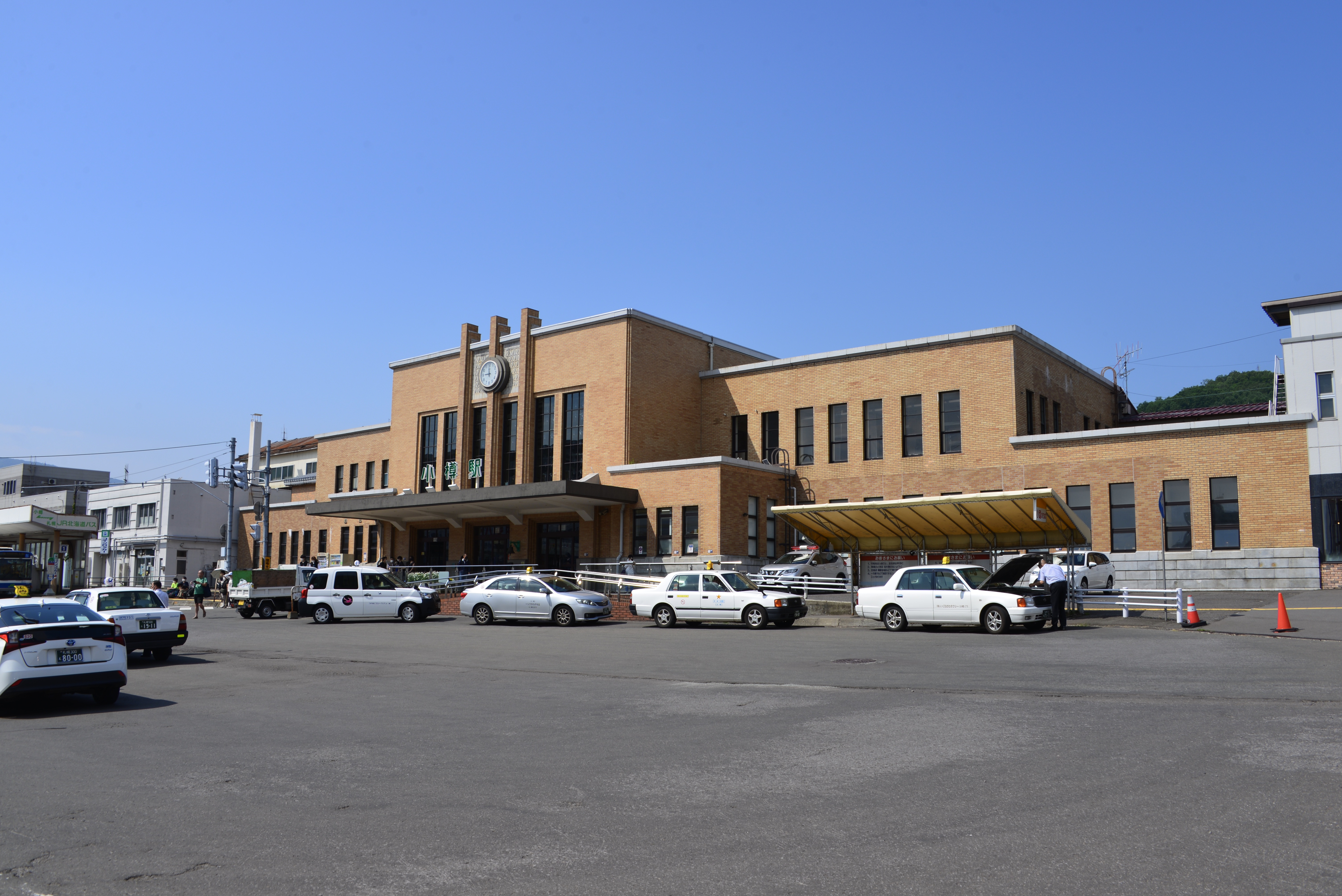
- The station frontage in June 2022

General information
- Location: 2-22-15 Inaho, Otaru City; Hokkaido Prefecture; Japan
- Operator: JR Hokkaido
- Line: Hakodate Main Line
- Distance: 252.5 km (156.9 mi) from Hakodate
- Platforms: 2 island platforms
- Tracks: 4

Construction
- Structure type: On embankment

Other information
- Status: Staffed
- Station code: S15

History
- Opened: 28 June 1903; 123 years ago
- Former names: Otaru Chūō; Takashima Station; Chūō Otaru (until 1920)

Passengers
- FY2015: 8,973 daily

Services
Preceding station	JR Hokkaido	Following station
Shioya S16 towards Hakodate	Hakodate Main Line Local	Minami-Otaru S14 towards Asahikawa
Terminus	Special Rapid Airport	Minami-Otaru S14 towards New Chitose Airport
Terminus	Rapid Airport	Minami-Otaru S14 towards New Chitose Airport
Shioya towards Kutchan	Niseko Liner	Minami-Otaru S14 towards Sapporo
Location
- Location within Hokkaido Location within Japan

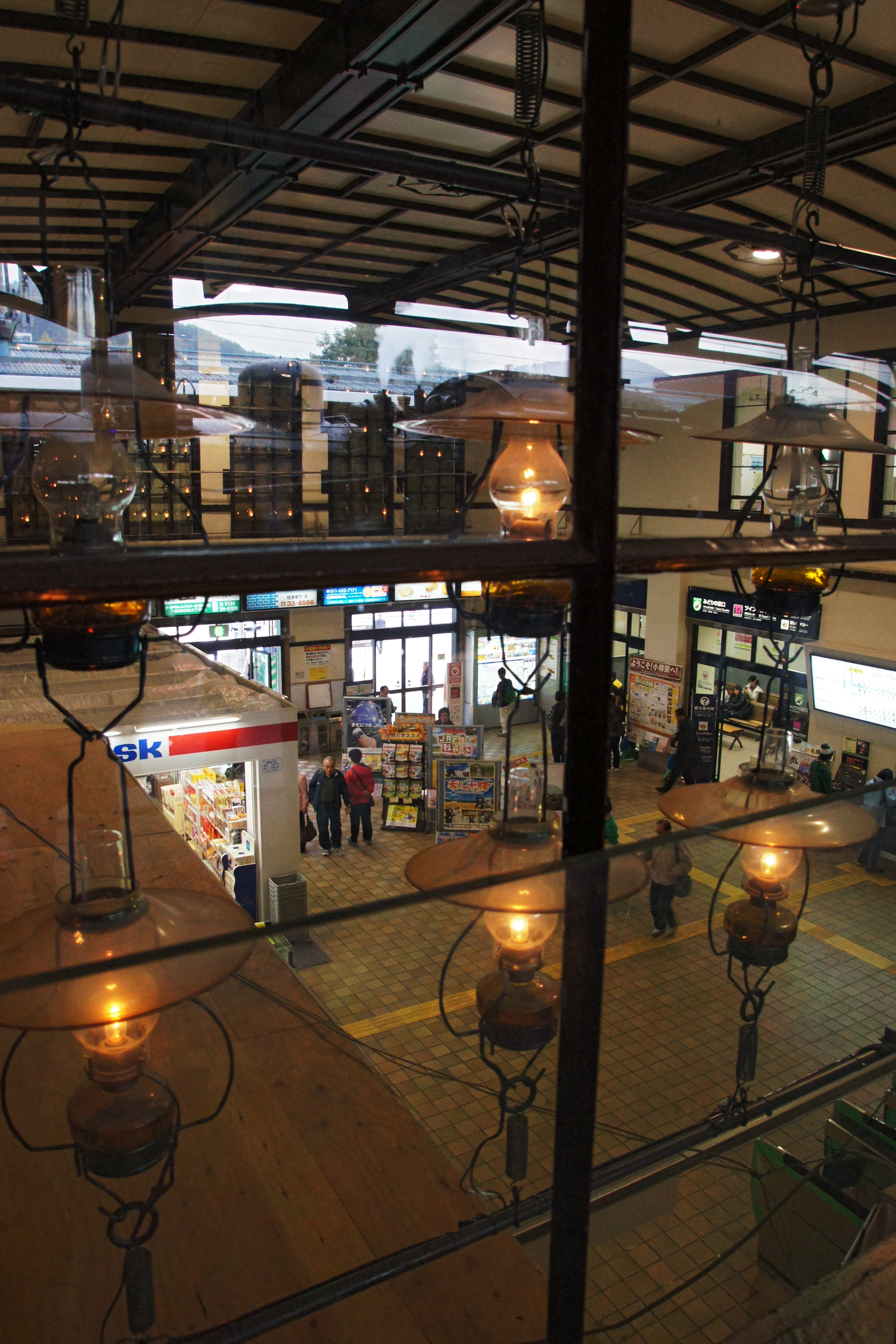
Entrance hall

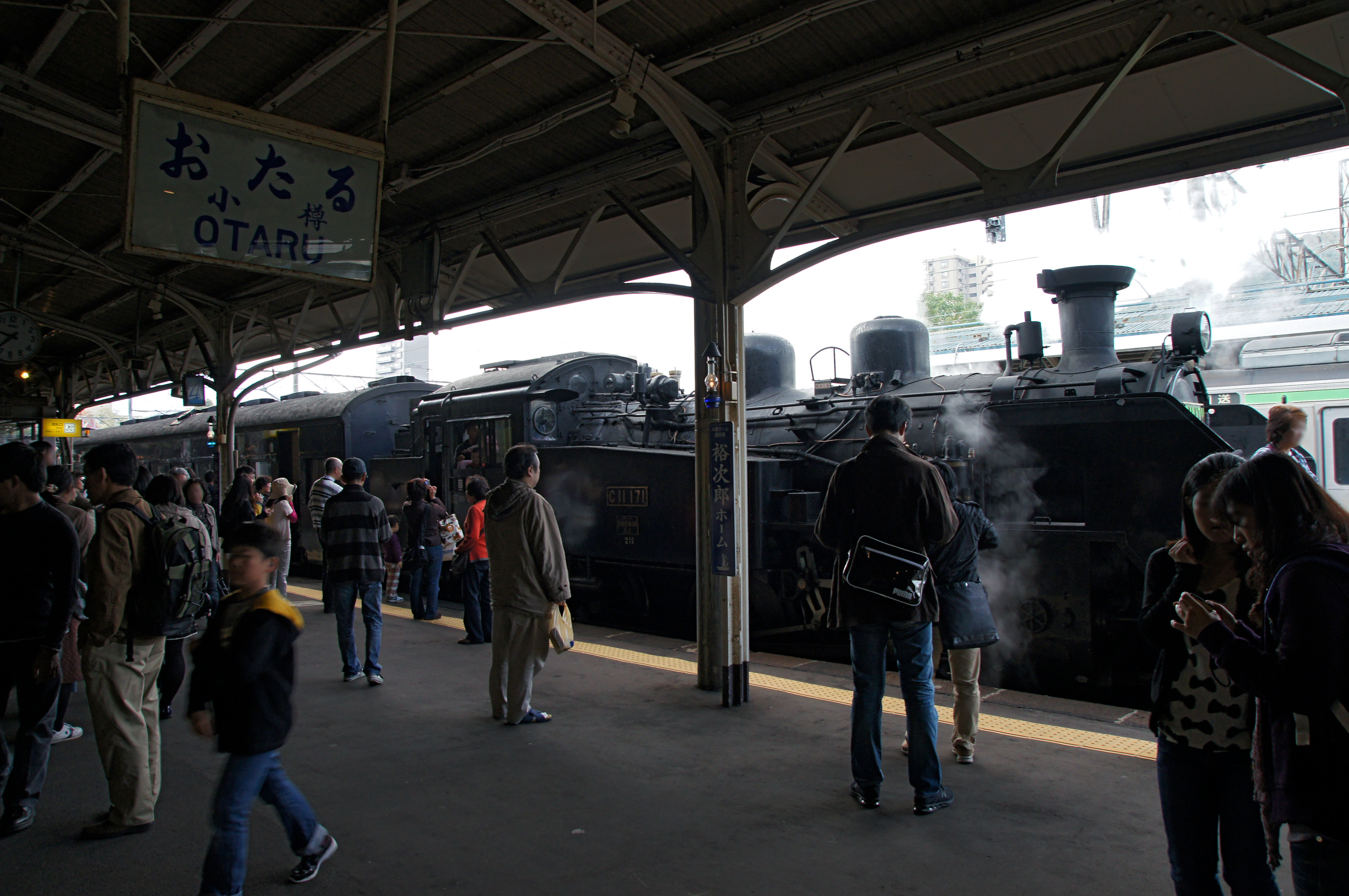
Platform

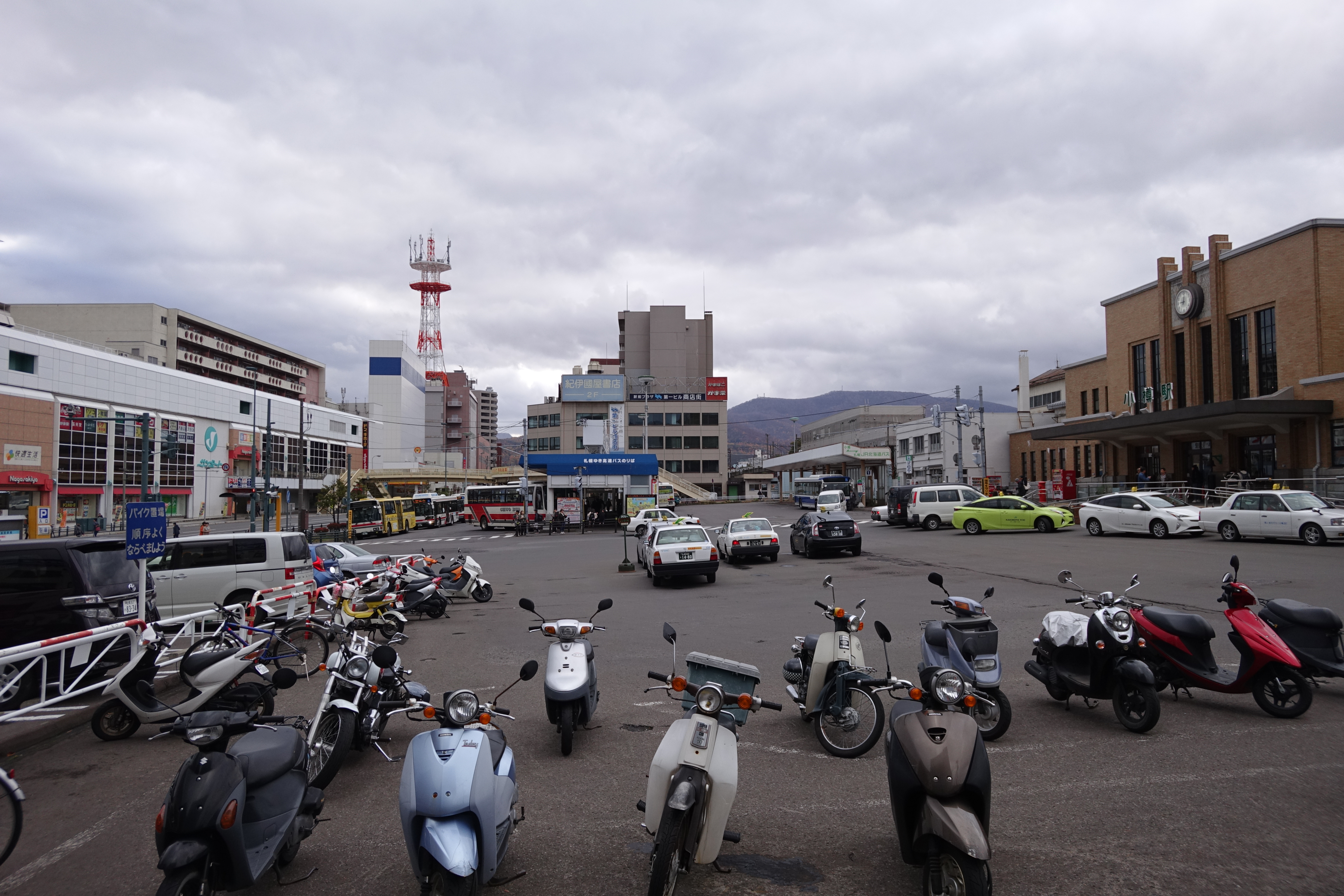
Parking lot and bus terminal in front of the station

Otaru Station (小樽駅, Otaru-eki) is a railway station in Otaru, Hokkaido, Japan, operated by the Hokkaido Railway Company (JR Hokkaido). It is numbered "S15".

== Lines ==
Otaru Station is served by the Hakodate Main Line.

== Station layout ==
The station consists of two island platforms serving four tracks. The station has automated ticket machines, automated turnstiles which accept Kitaca, and a "Midori no Madoguchi" staffed ticket office.

=== Platforms ===
1, 2, 4	■ Hakodate Main Line	for Sapporo, Iwamizawa and New Chitose Airport for Yoichi, Kutchan and Oshamambe
5	■ Hakodate Main Line	for Sapporo, Iwamizawa and New Chitose Airport

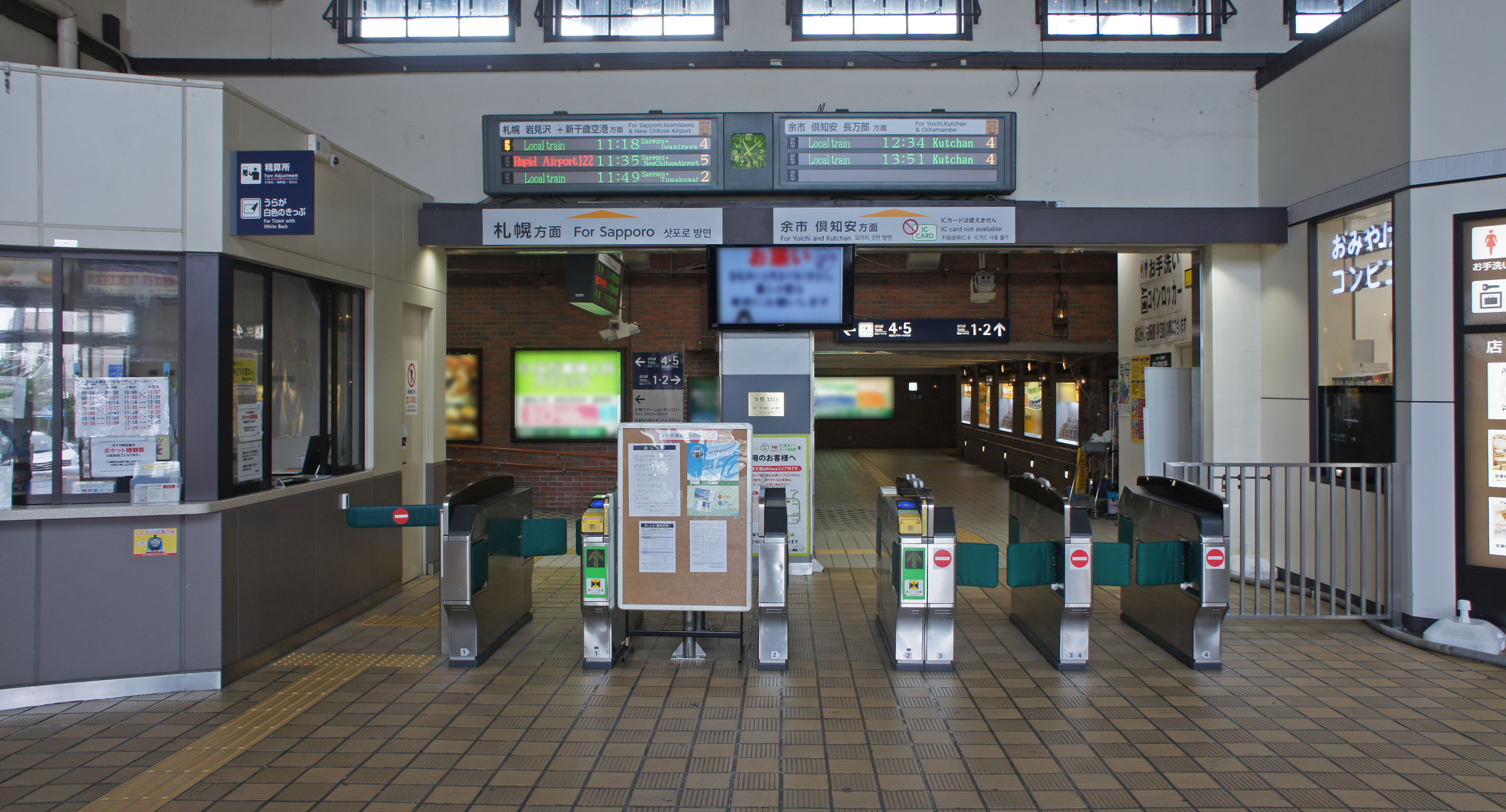
Station entrance gates

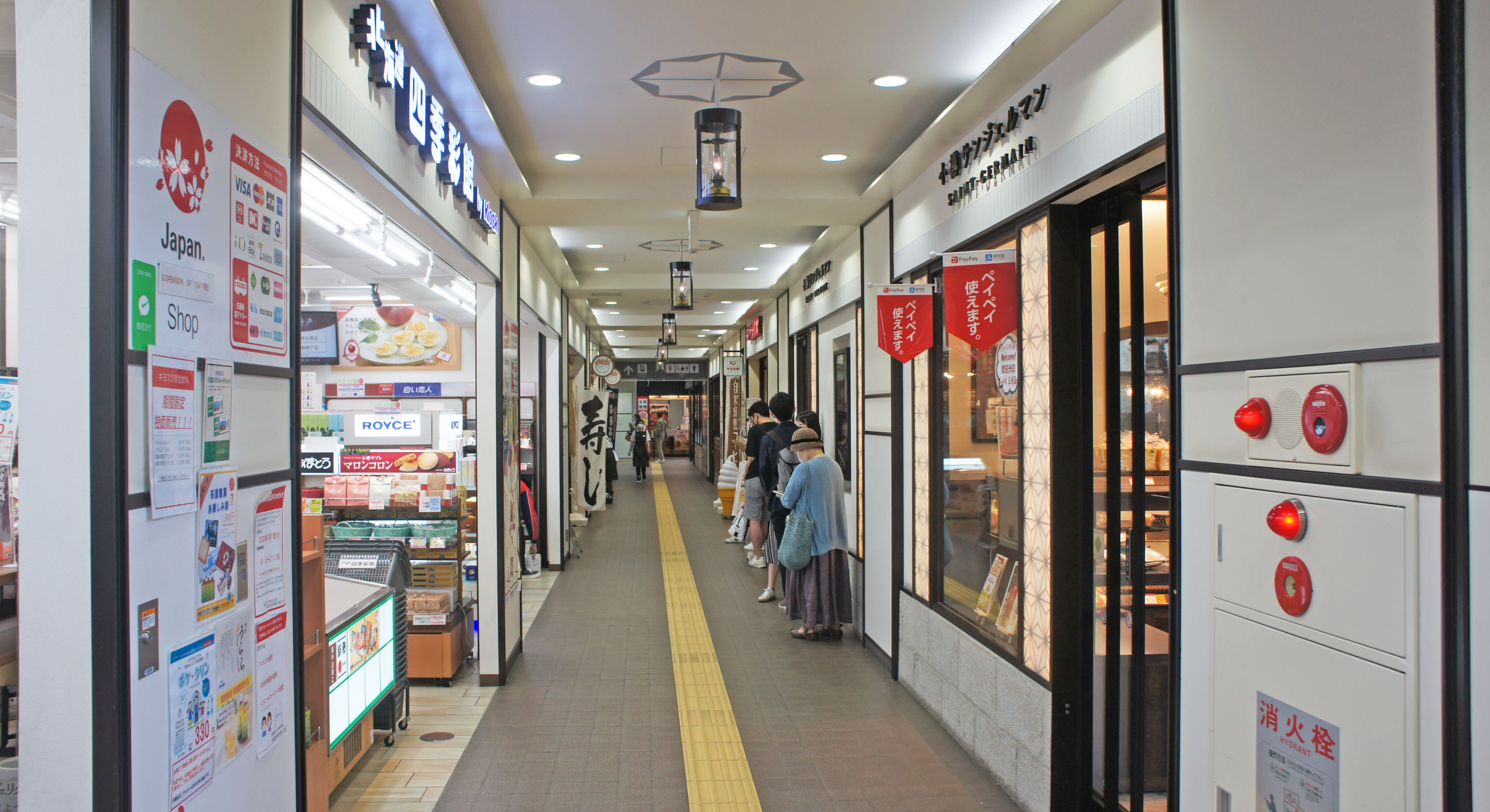
Station store area

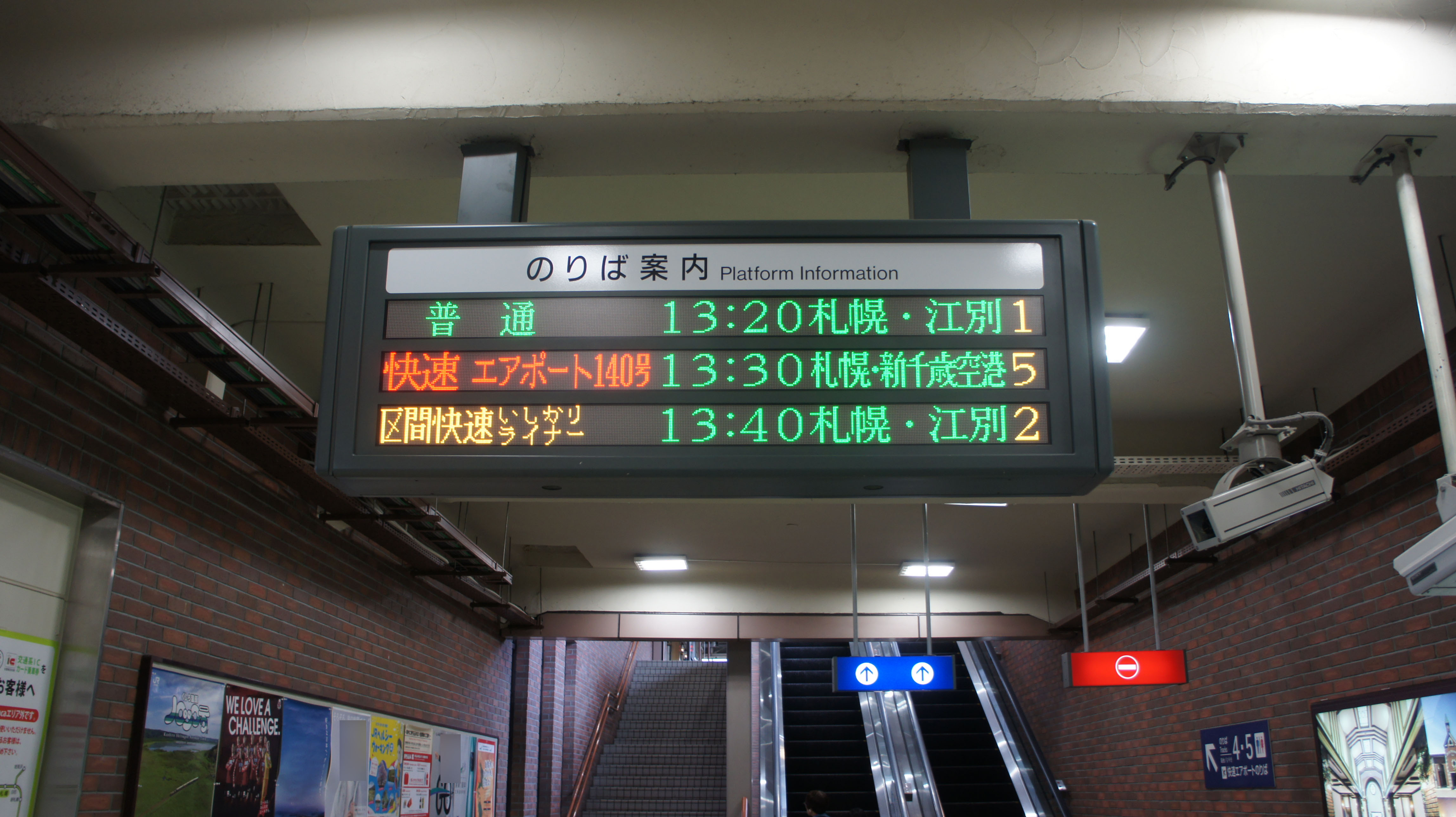
Departure information board in the ticket gate

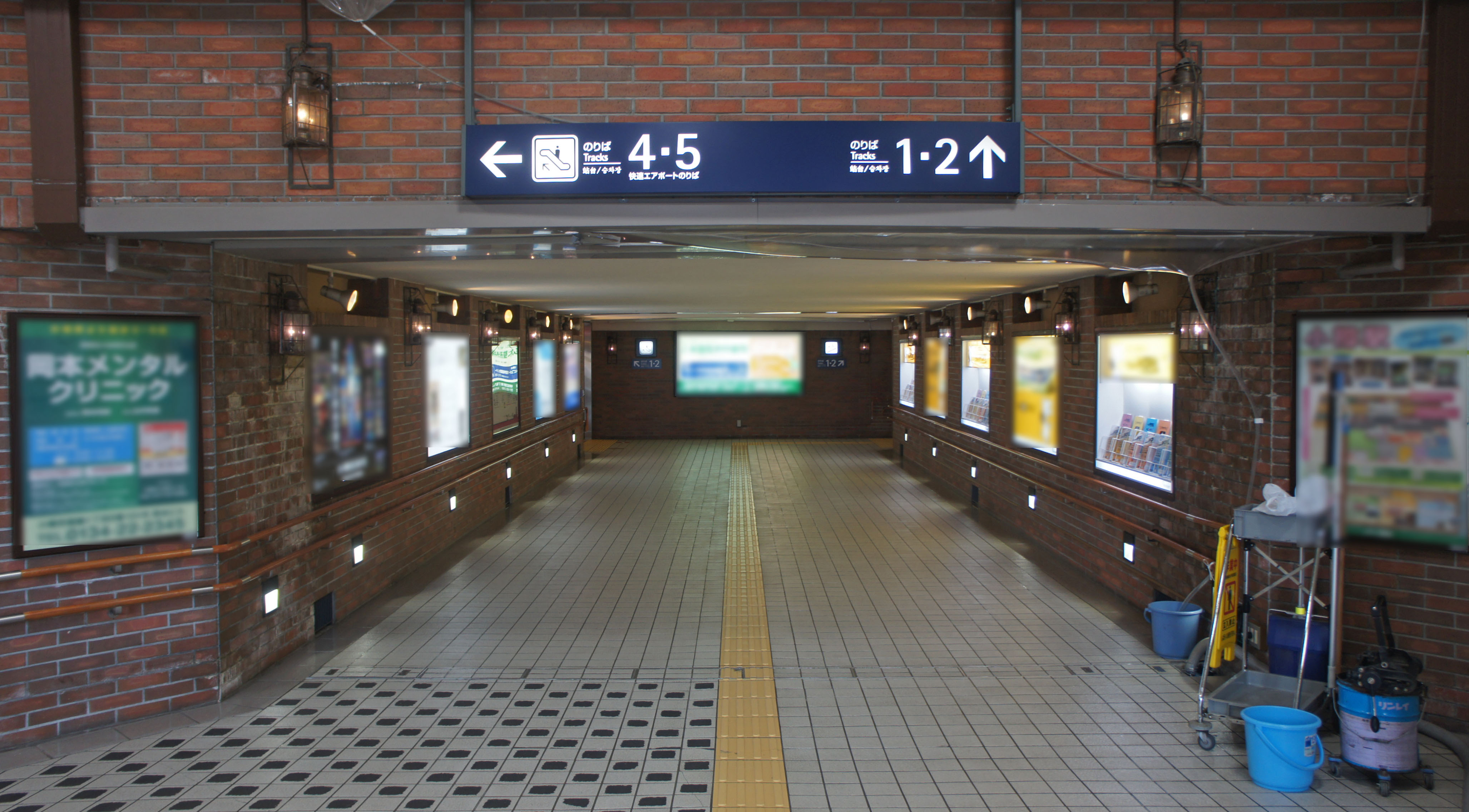
Underground passageway

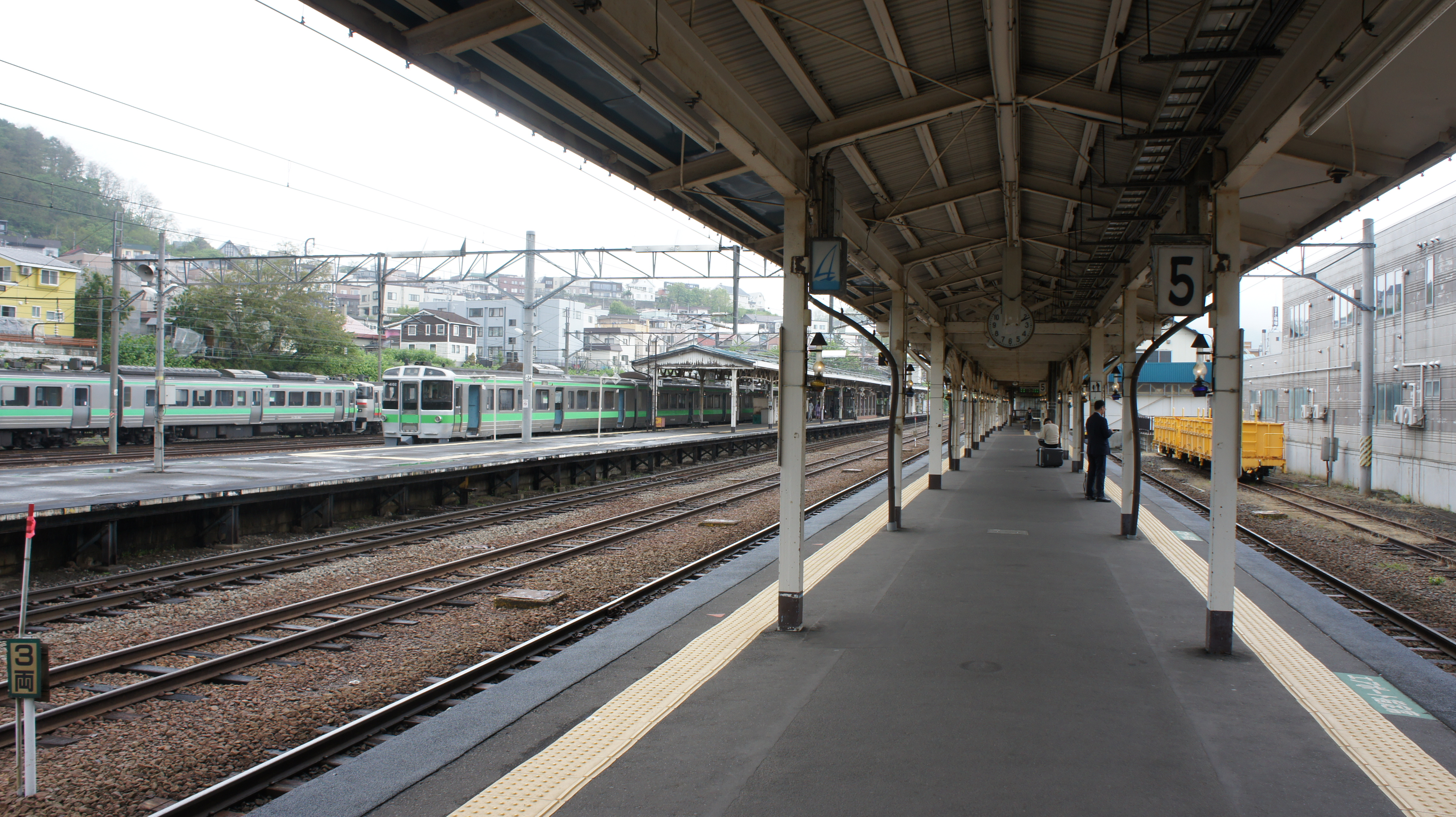
Station platform (Overall)

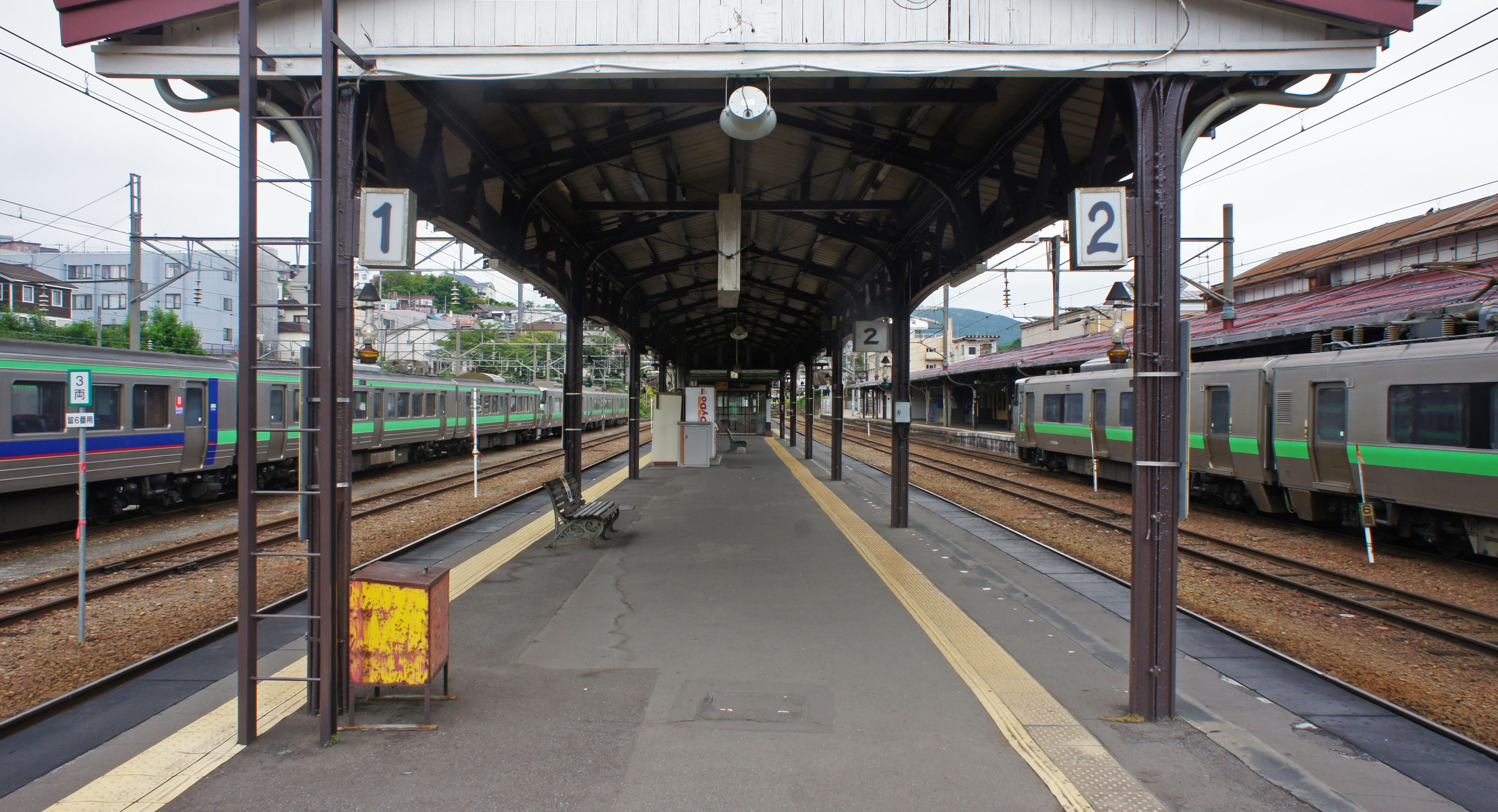
Station platform 1 and 2

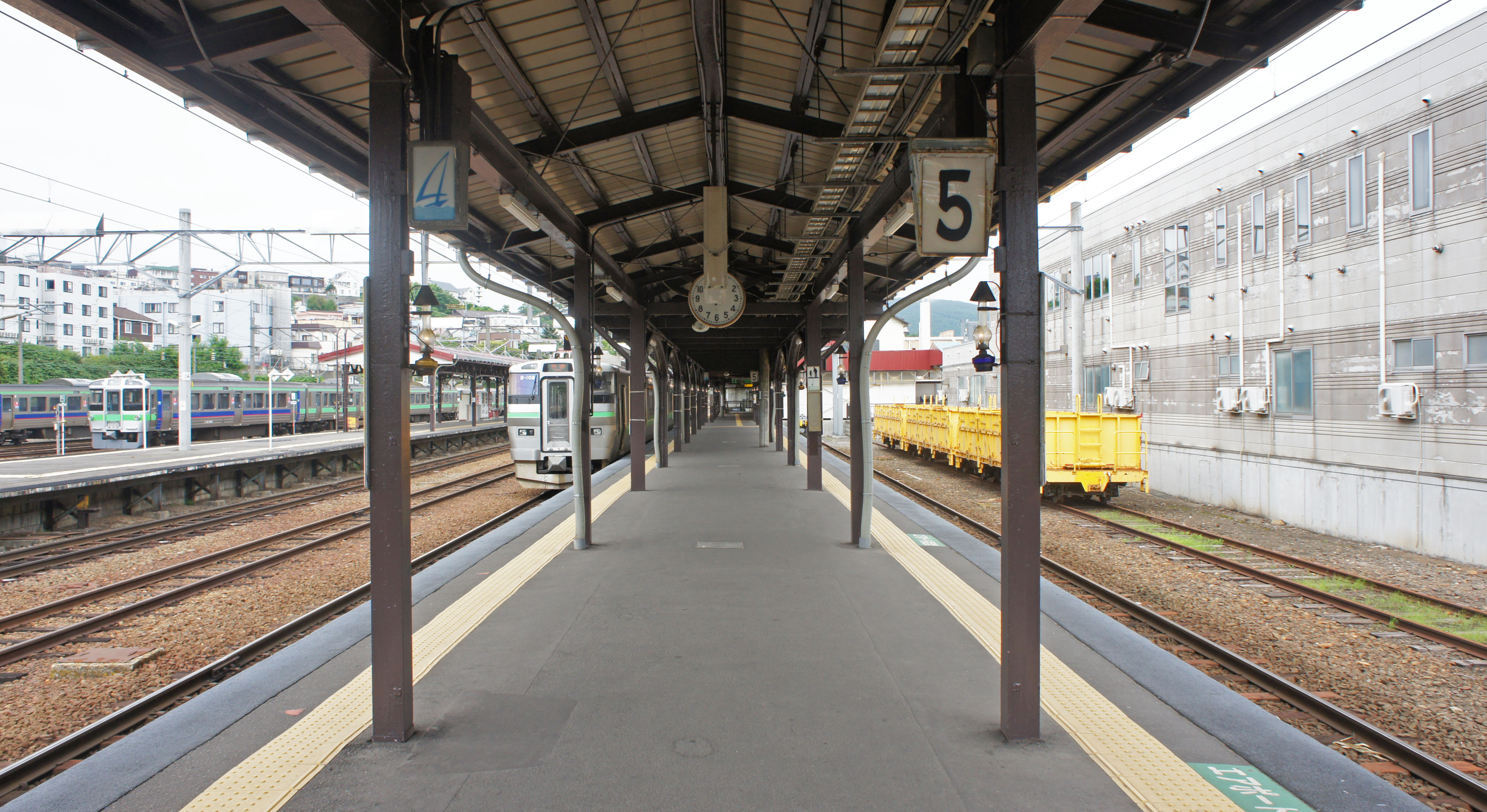
Station platform 4 and 5

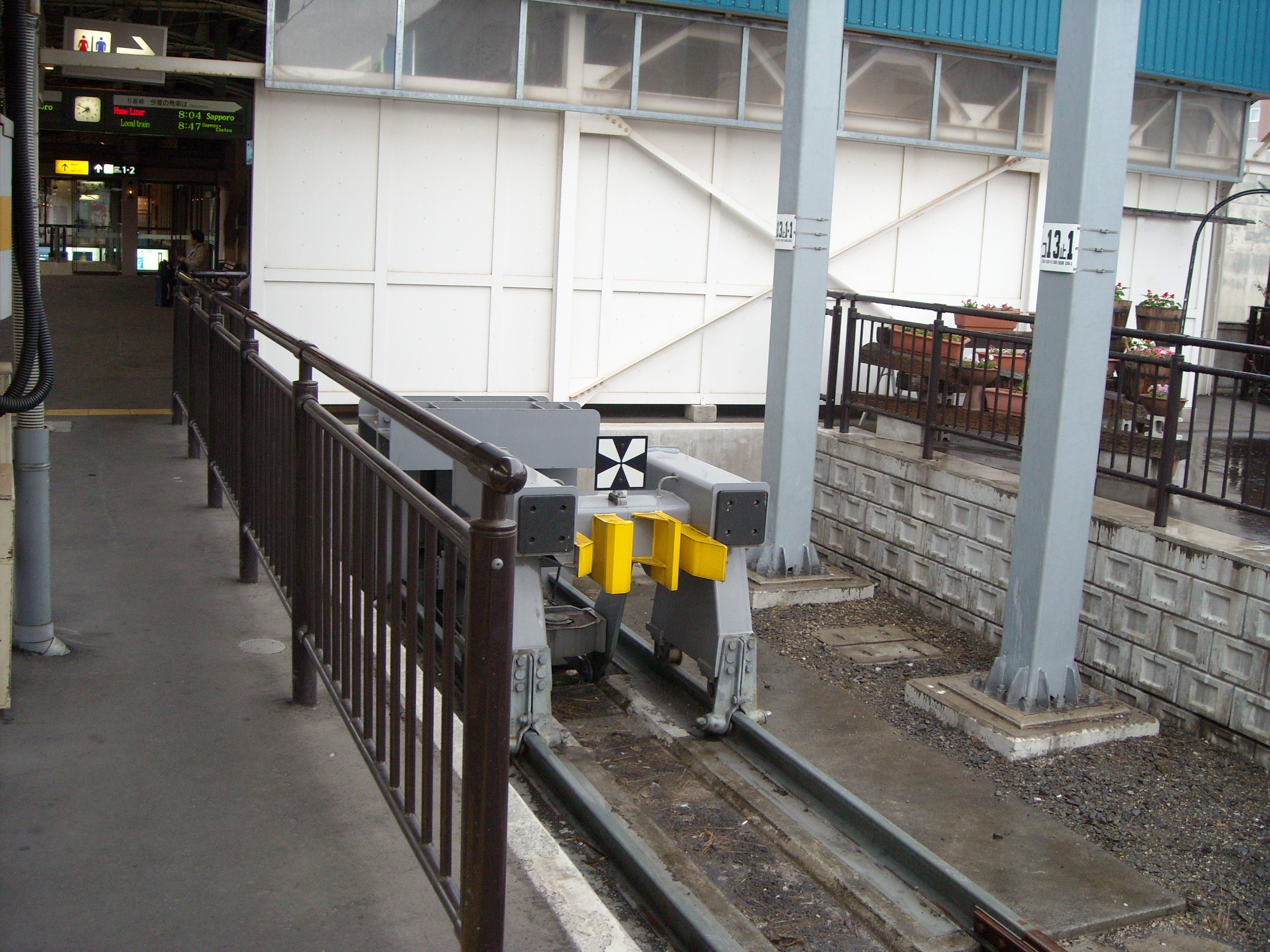
Buffer stop at platform 5

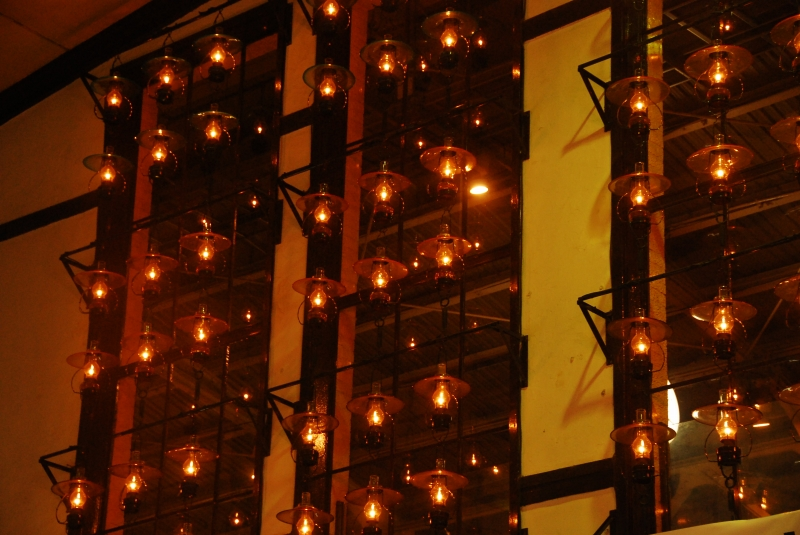
Otaru station lamps

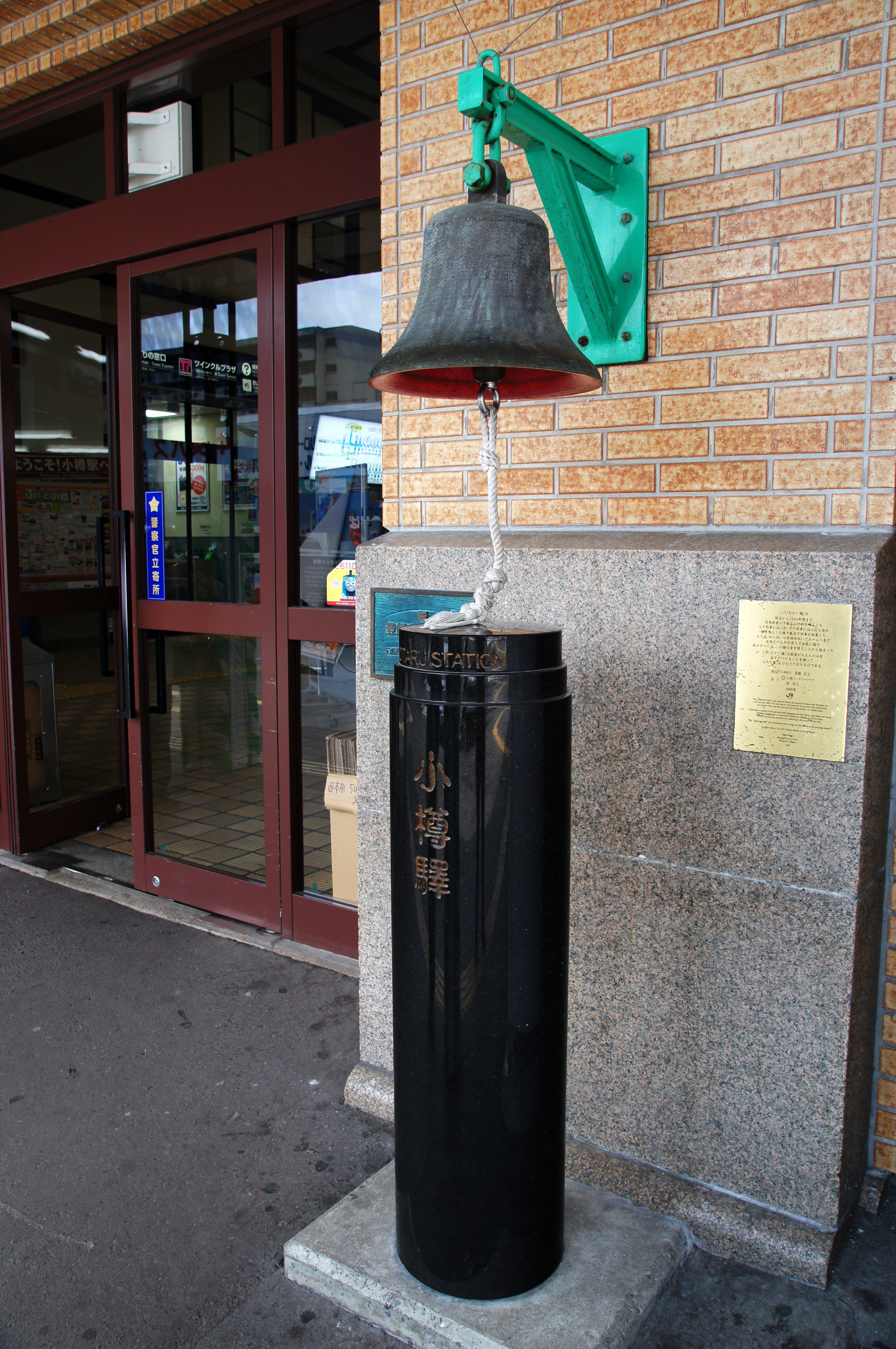
Opposite Bell

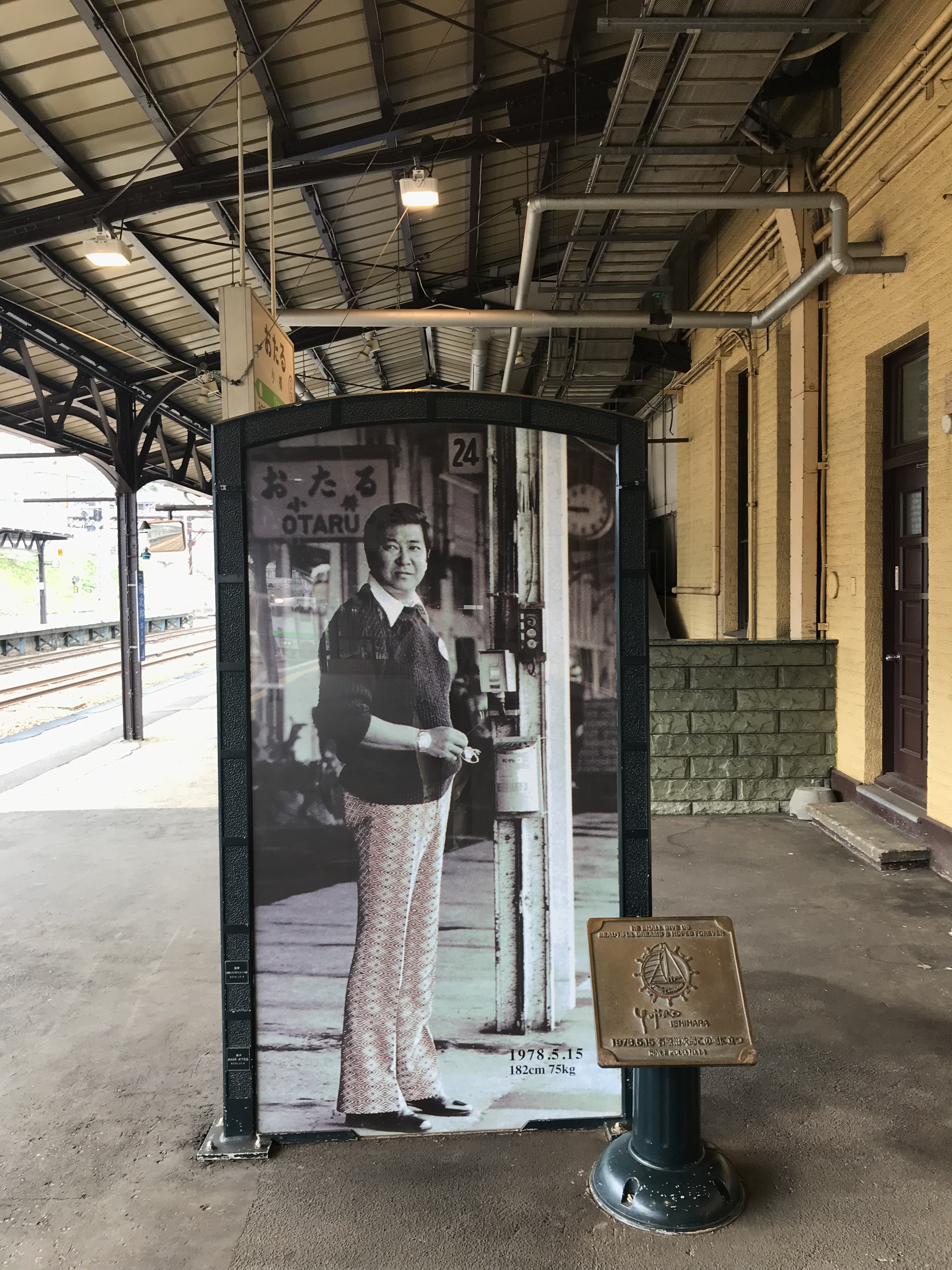
Picture panel of Yujiro Ishihara

== History ==
Otaru Station opened on 28 June 1903. The station name was originally Otaru Chūō Station (小樽中央駅, Otaru Chūō eki). The name was changed on 15 October 1904 to Takashima Station (高島駅, Takashima eki), on 15 December 1905 to Chūō Otaru Station (中央小樽駅, Chūō Otaru eki) and on 15 July 1920 to the present one. From 11 June 1900 to 14 July 1920, present-day Minami-Otaru Station was called Otaru Station.

== Surrounding area ==
- Otaru Park
- Otaru City Office
- Otaru University of Commerce

== See also ==
- List of railway stations in Japan
