= Iburi (disambiguation) =

Iburi may refer to:

- Iburi Subprefecture
- Iburi Province, a former province in Hokkaido, Japan
- Iburi Izō
