= Eniwa =

Eniwa (恵庭, Eniwa) may refer to:

- Eniwa, Hokkaido, a city in Japan
- Mount Eniwa, a volcano in Ishikari, Hokkaidō, Japan
