= Osatsu Station =

Railway station in Chitose, Hokkaido, Japan

H12 Osatsu Station 長都駅
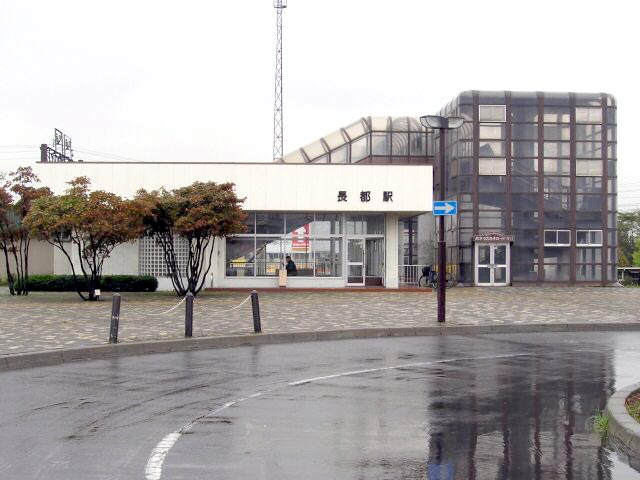
- Station building, October 2004

General information
- Location: Kamichoto, Chitose; Hokkaido Prefecture; Japan
- Coordinates: 42.8518°N 141.6230°E
- Owner: JR Hokkaido
- Line: Chitose Line
- Platforms: 2 side platforms
- Tracks: 2

Construction
- Structure type: At grade
- Accessible: No

Other information
- Status: Unstaffed
- Station code: H12
- Website: Official website

History
- Opened: 1 July 1958; 68 years ago

Services
Preceding station	JR Hokkaido	Following station
Chitose towards Numanohata or New Chitose Airport	Chitose Line Local	Sapporo Beer Teien towards Sapporo
Chitose towards New Chitose Airport	Semi-Rapid Airport	Sapporo Beer Teien towards Sapporo
Location
- Location within Hokkaido Location within Japan

Osatsu Station (長都駅, Osatsu-eki) is a railway station on the Chitose Line located in Chitose, Hokkaidō, Japan.

== Lines ==
- Hokkaido Railway Company
  - Chitose Line Station H12

== History ==
Osatsu Station opened on 1 July 1958 as Yamuwakka Station (止若駅). It was renamed to its current name, Makubetsu Station, in 1963.

With the privatization of the Japan National Railway (JNR) on 1 April 1987, the station came under the aegis of the Hokkaido Railway Company (JR Hokkaido).
