= Izarigawa Dam =

Coordinates: 42°50′44″N 141°26′53″E

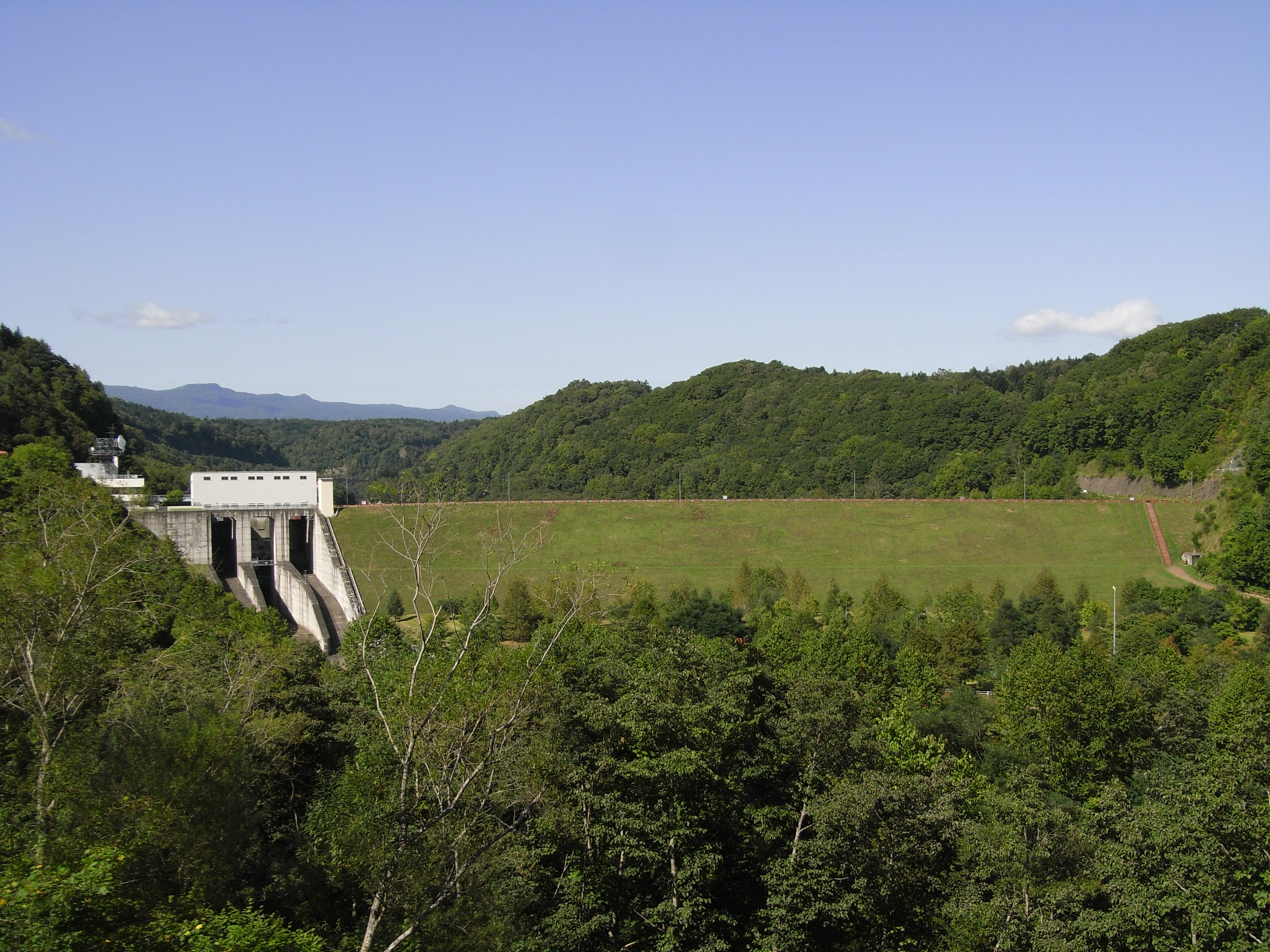
- Interactive map of Izarigawa Dam
- Location: Hokkaidō, Japan
- Construction began: 1971
- Opening date: 1980

Dam and spillways
- Impounds: Izari River
- Height: 45.5 m
- Length: 190.5 m

Reservoir
- Total capacity: 15,300,000 m^{3}
- Catchment area: 113.3 km^{2}
- Surface area: 110 hectares

The Izarigawa Dam (漁川ダム) is a dam in Eniwa, Hokkaido, Japan.

Work on the Izarigawa Dam began in 1971 and it began operating in 1980. The dam is 45.5 meters high, with a crest length of 270 meters. The dam's volume is 647,000 square meters. Its catchment area is 113.3 square km and its total water surface area is 110 hectares. The dam's maximum capacity is 15,300 square meters.

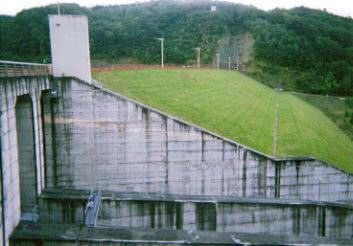
The Izarigawa Dam

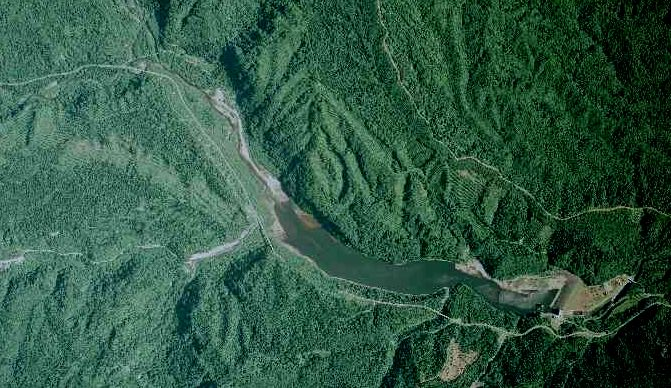
Satellite photo of the Izarigawa Dam and its surrounding areas
