= Megumino Station =

Railway station in Eniwa, Hokkaido, Japan

Coordinates: 42.9026°N 141.5746°E

Megumino Station 恵み野駅
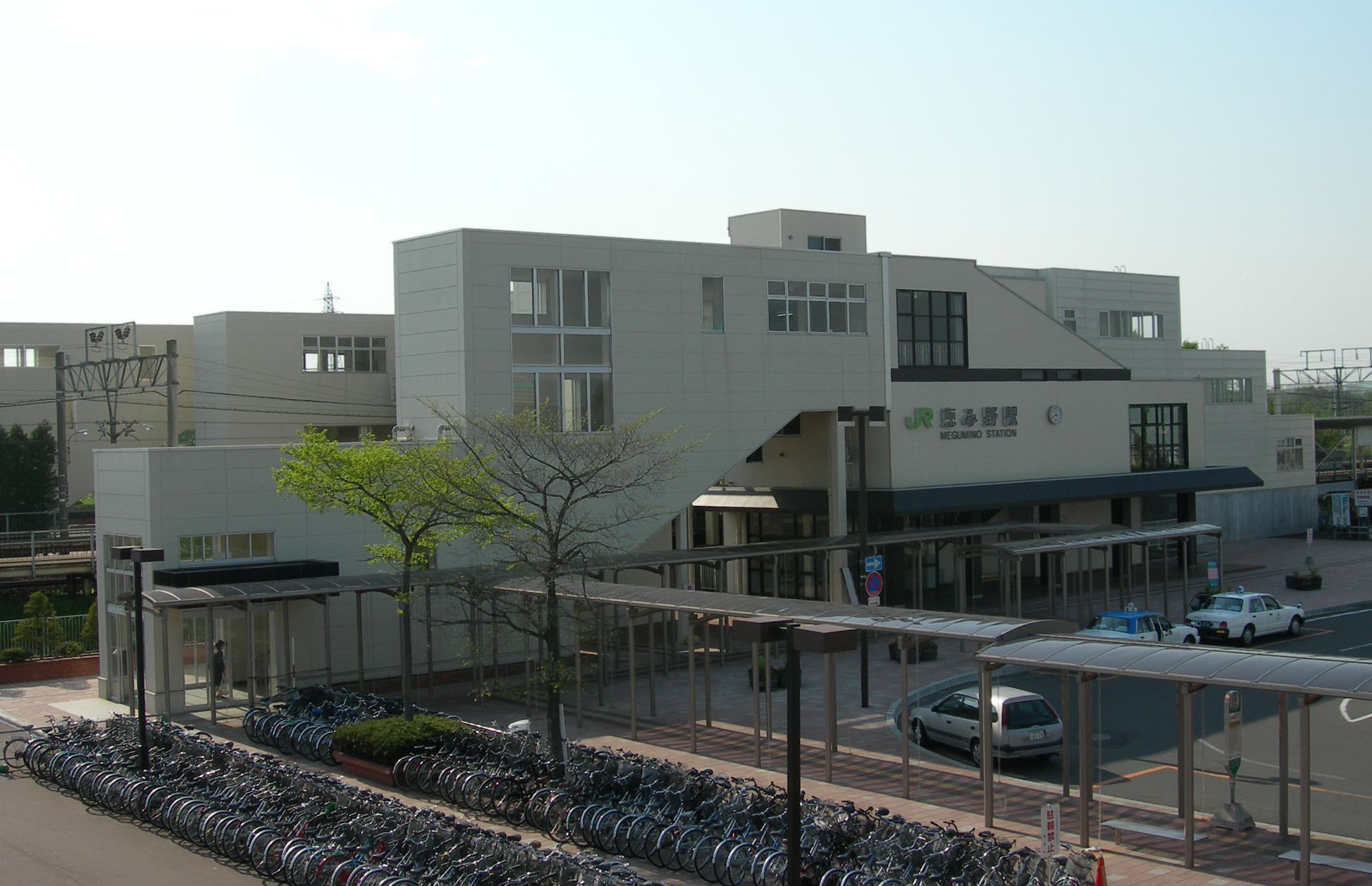
- Megumino Station

General information
- Location: 1-chome Megino Nishi, Eniwa; Hokkaido Prefecture; Japan
- System: Railway station
- Operator: JR Hokkaido
- Line: Chitose Line
- Platforms: 2 side platforms
- Tracks: 2

Construction
- Structure type: At grade

Other information
- Station code: H09

History
- Opened: 1 March 1982; 44 years ago

Services
Preceding station	JR Hokkaido	Following station
Eniwa towards Numanohata or New Chitose Airport	Chitose Line Local	Shimamatsu towards Sapporo
Eniwa towards New Chitose Airport	Semi-Rapid Airport	Shimamatsu towards Sapporo
Location
- Location within Hokkaido Location within Japan

Megumino Station (恵み野駅, Megumino-eki) is a railway station on the Chitose Line in Eniwa, Hokkaido, Japan, operated by Hokkaido Railway Company (JR Hokkaido).

== Lines ==
Megumino Station is served by the Chitose Line.

== Station layout ==
The station has two side platforms serving two tracks.

=== Platforms ===
1	■ Chitose Line	for New Chitose Airport and Tomakomai
2	■ Chitose Line	for Sapporo and Otaru

== History ==
The station opened on 1 March 1982. With the privatization of Japanese National Railways (JNR) on 1 April 1987, the station came under the control of JR Hokkaido.

== See also ==
- List of railway stations in Japan
