= Shimamatsu Station =

Railway station in Eniwa, Hokkaido, Japan

Shimamatsu Station 島松駅
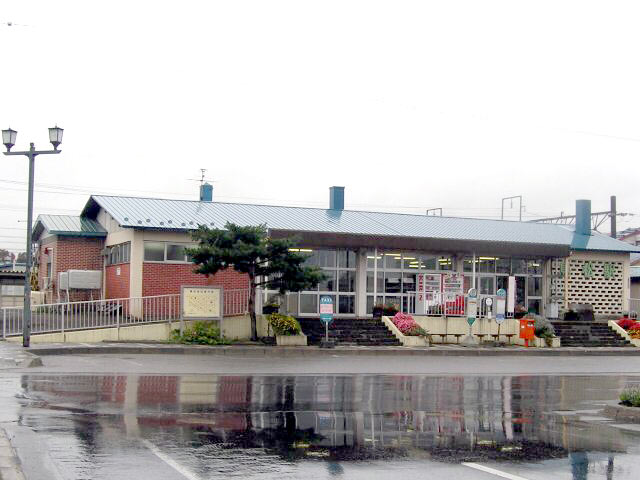
- Station building

General information
- Location: 1-chome Shimamatsunaka-cho, Eniwa; Hokkaido; Japan
- Coordinates: 42.9216°N 141.5727°E
- Operator: JR Hokkaido
- Line: Chitose Line
- Platforms: 1 island platform, 1 side platform
- Tracks: 3 in use

Construction
- Structure type: At grade

Other information
- Station code: H08

History
- Opened: 21 August 1926; 100 years ago

Services
Preceding station	JR Hokkaido	Following station
Megumino towards Numanohata or New Chitose Airport	Chitose Line Local	Kitahiroshima towards Sapporo
Megumino towards New Chitose Airport	Semi-Rapid Airport	Kitahiroshima towards Sapporo
Location
- Location within Hokkaido Location within Japan

Shimamatsu Station (島松駅, Shimamatsu-eki) is a railway station of the Chitose Line located in Eniwa, Hokkaido, Japan.
