= Kita-Hiroshima Station =

Railway station in Kitahiroshima, Hokkaido, Japan

Coordinates: 42.9793°N 141.5633°E

Kita-Hiroshima Station 北広島駅
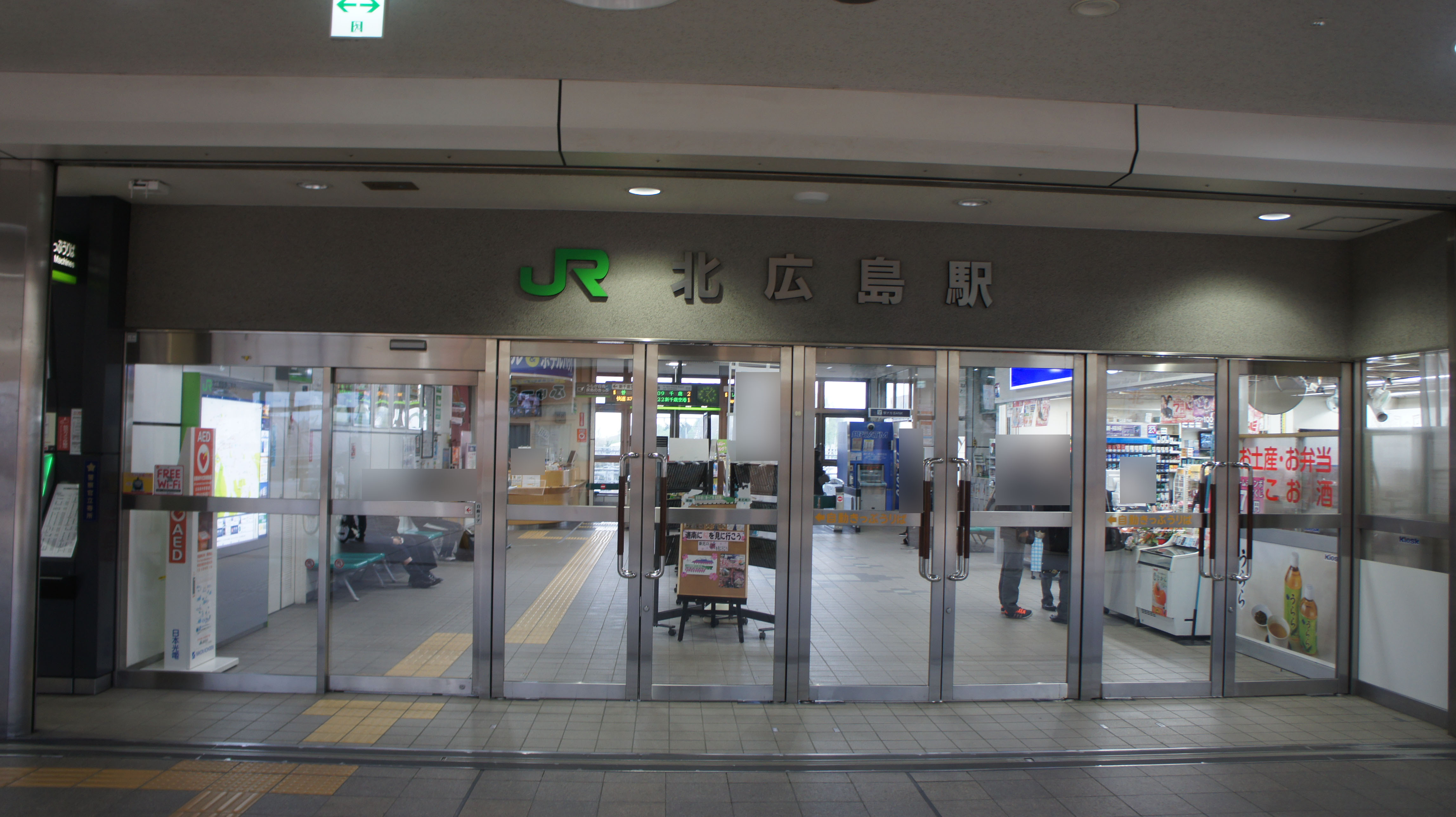
- JR Chitose-Line, Kita-Hiroshima Station Entrance

General information
- Location: 6-10 Chuo, Kitahiroshima; Hokkaido Prefecture; Japan
- Operator: JR Hokkaido
- Line: Chitose Line
- Platforms: 2 island platforms
- Tracks: 4

Construction
- Structure type: At grade

Other information
- Station code: H07

History
- Opened: 21 August 1926; 100 years ago

Services
| Preceding station | JR Hokkaido | Following station |
|---|---|---|
| Shimamatsu towards Numanohata or New Chitose Airport | Chitose Line Local | Kami-Nopporo towards Sapporo |
| Shimamatsu towards New Chitose Airport | Semi-Rapid Airport | Shin-Sapporo towards Sapporo |
| Eniwa towards New Chitose Airport | Rapid Airport | Shin-Sapporo towards Otaru |
Location
- Location within Hokkaido Location within Japan

Kita-Hiroshima Station (北広島駅, Kitahiroshima-eki) is a railway station on the Chitose Line located in Kitahiroshima, Hokkaidō, Japan.
