= Sapporo Beer Teien Station =

Railway station in Eniwa, Hokkaido, Japan

Coordinates: 42.86748°N 141.604811°E

H11 Sapporo Beer Teien Station サッポロビール庭園駅
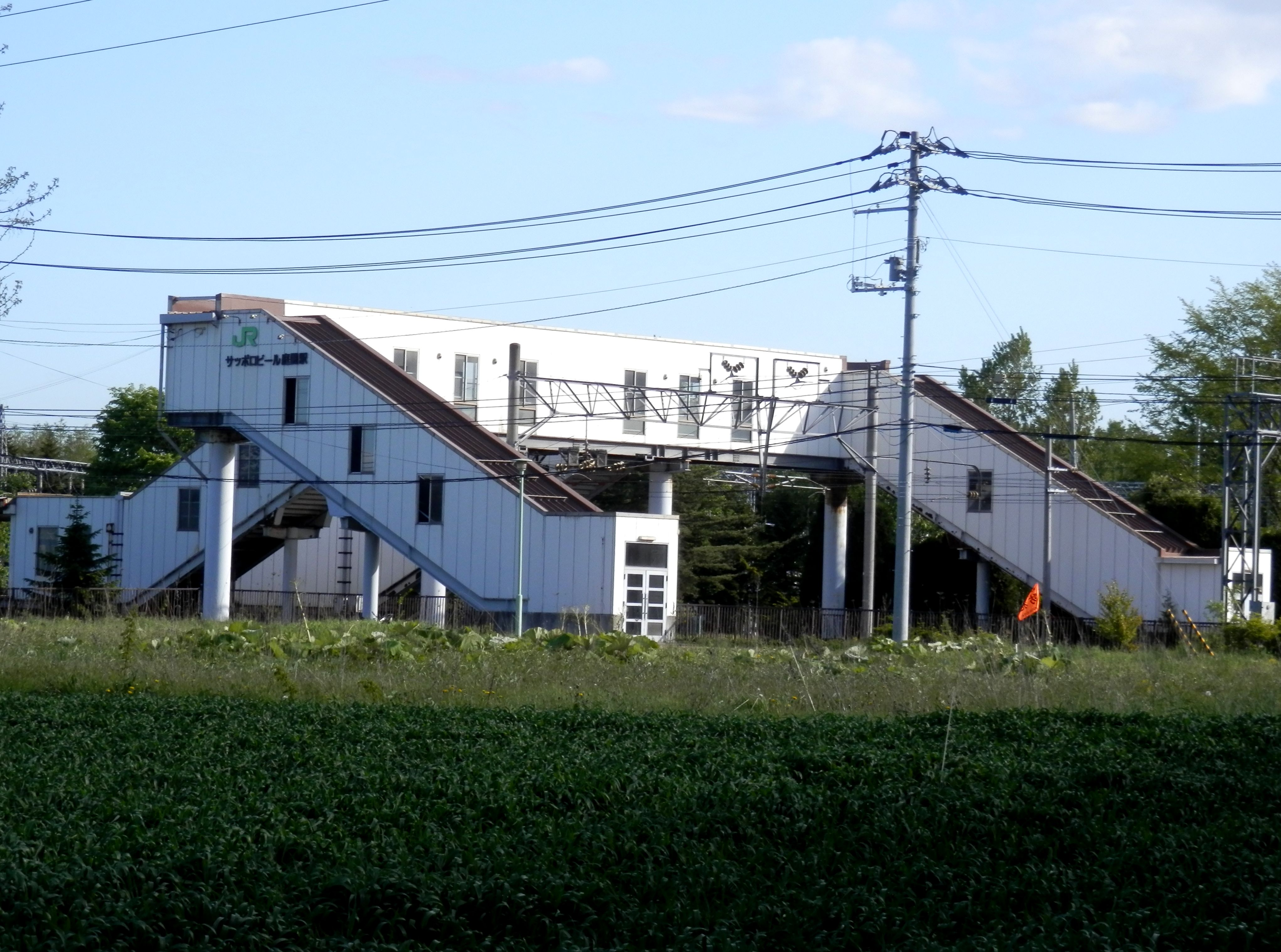
- Sapporo Beer Teien Station

General information
- Location: Toiso, Eniwa; Hokkaido Prefecture; Japan
- System: Rapid transit station
- Owner: Sapporo Holdings
- Operator: JR Hokkaido
- Line: Chitose Line
- Platforms: 2 island platforms
- Tracks: 4

Construction
- Structure type: At grade

Other information
- Station code: H11
- Website: http://www2.jrhokkaido.co.jp/global/

Services
Preceding station	JR Hokkaido	Following station
Osatsu towards Numanohata or New Chitose Airport	Chitose Line	Eniwa towards Sapporo
Osatsu towards New Chitose Airport	Semi-Rapid Airport	Eniwa towards Sapporo
Location
- Location within Hokkaido Location within Japan

Sapporo Beer Teien Station (サッポロビール庭園駅, Sapporobīru-teien-eki) is a railway station on the Chitose Line in Eniwa, Hokkaido, Japan, operated by the Hokkaido Railway Company (JR Hokkaido). The station opened on July 1, 1990. The Hokkaido Brewery of Sapporo Breweries is located in front of the station.
