= Hokkaido Bunkyo University =

Private university in Hokkaido, Japan

Coordinates: 42°53′26″N 141°35′31″E

- 北海道文教大学
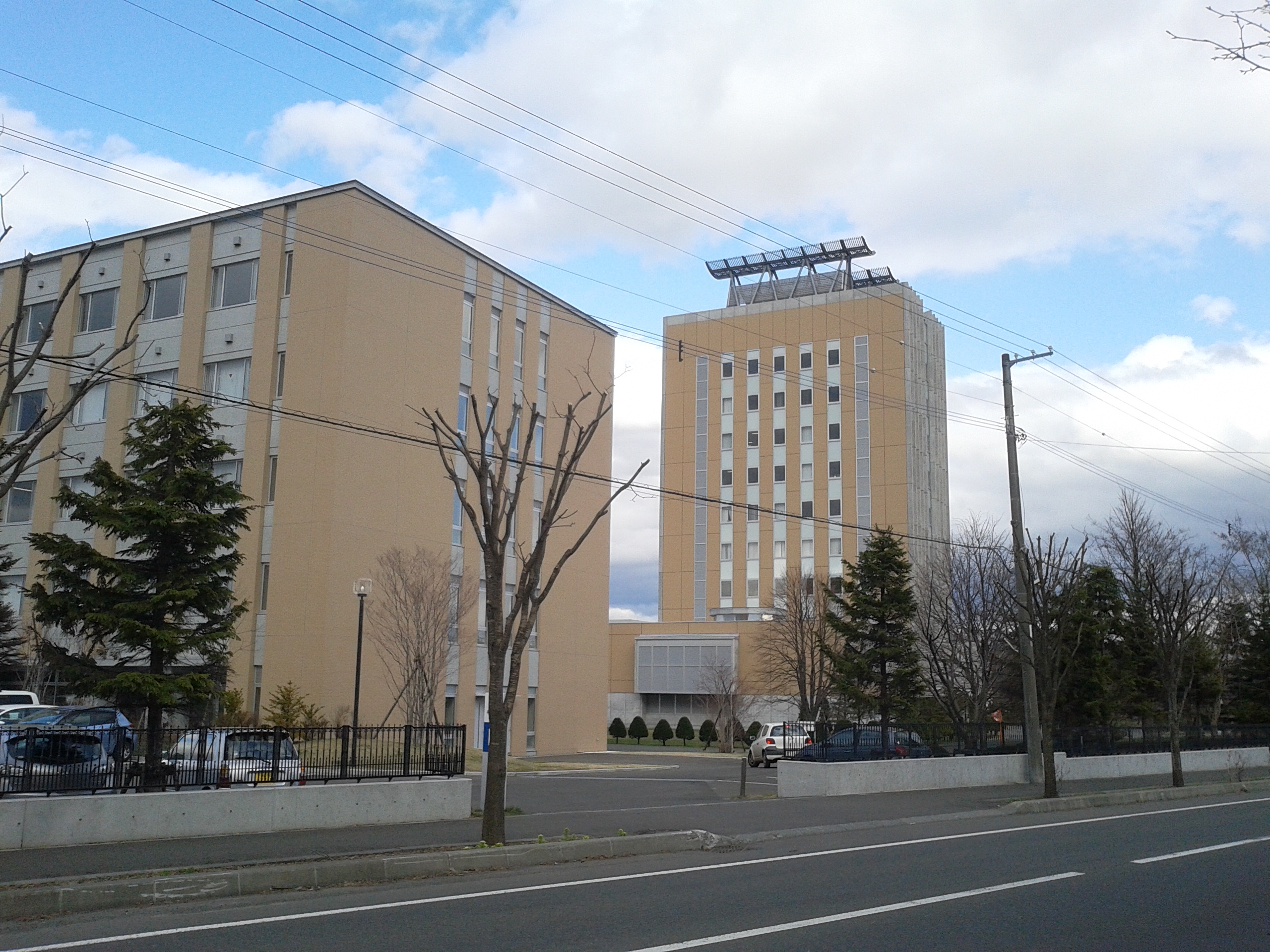
- Type: Private
- Established: 1999
- Location: Sapporo, Hokkaidō, Japan
- Website: Official website

Hokkaido Bunkyo University (北海道文教大学, Hokkaidō bunkyō daigaku) is a private university in Hokkaido, Japan, established in 1999. It has campuses in Eniwa and Sapporo. Its junior college division is coeducational. The predecessor of the school, a women's school, was founded in 1942.
