= Eniwa Station =

Railway station in Eniwa, Hokkaido, Japan

Coordinates: 42.882725°N 141.586819°E

H10 Eniwa Station 恵庭駅
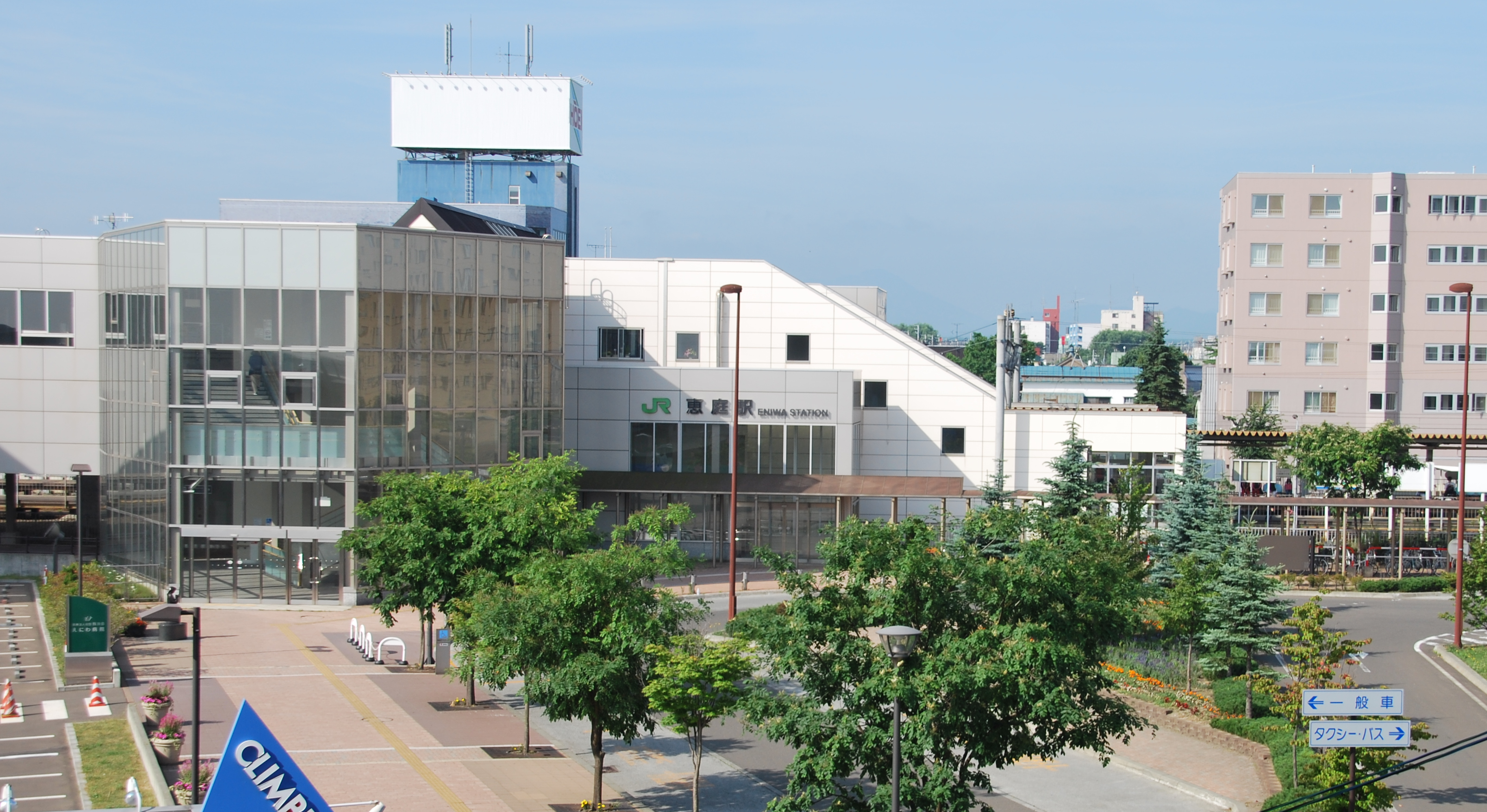
- West side of Eniwa Station

General information
- Location: 501-1 Aioicho, Eniwa; Hokkaido Prefecture; Japan
- Operator: JR Hokkaido
- Line: Chitose Line
- Platforms: 2 side platforms
- Tracks: 2

Other information
- Station code: H10

History
- Opened: 21 August 1926; 100 years ago

Services
Preceding station	JR Hokkaido	Following station
Sapporo Beer Teien towards Numanohata or New Chitose Airport	Chitose Line Local	Megumino towards Sapporo
Sapporo Beer Teien towards New Chitose Airport	Semi-Rapid Airport	Megumino towards Sapporo
Chitose towards New Chitose Airport	Rapid Airport	Kitahiroshima towards Otaru
Location
- Location within Hokkaido Location within Japan

Eniwa Station (恵庭駅, Eniwa-eki) is a railway station on the Chitose Line located in Eniwa, Hokkaidō, Japan.
