= Iburi Province =

Former province of Japan

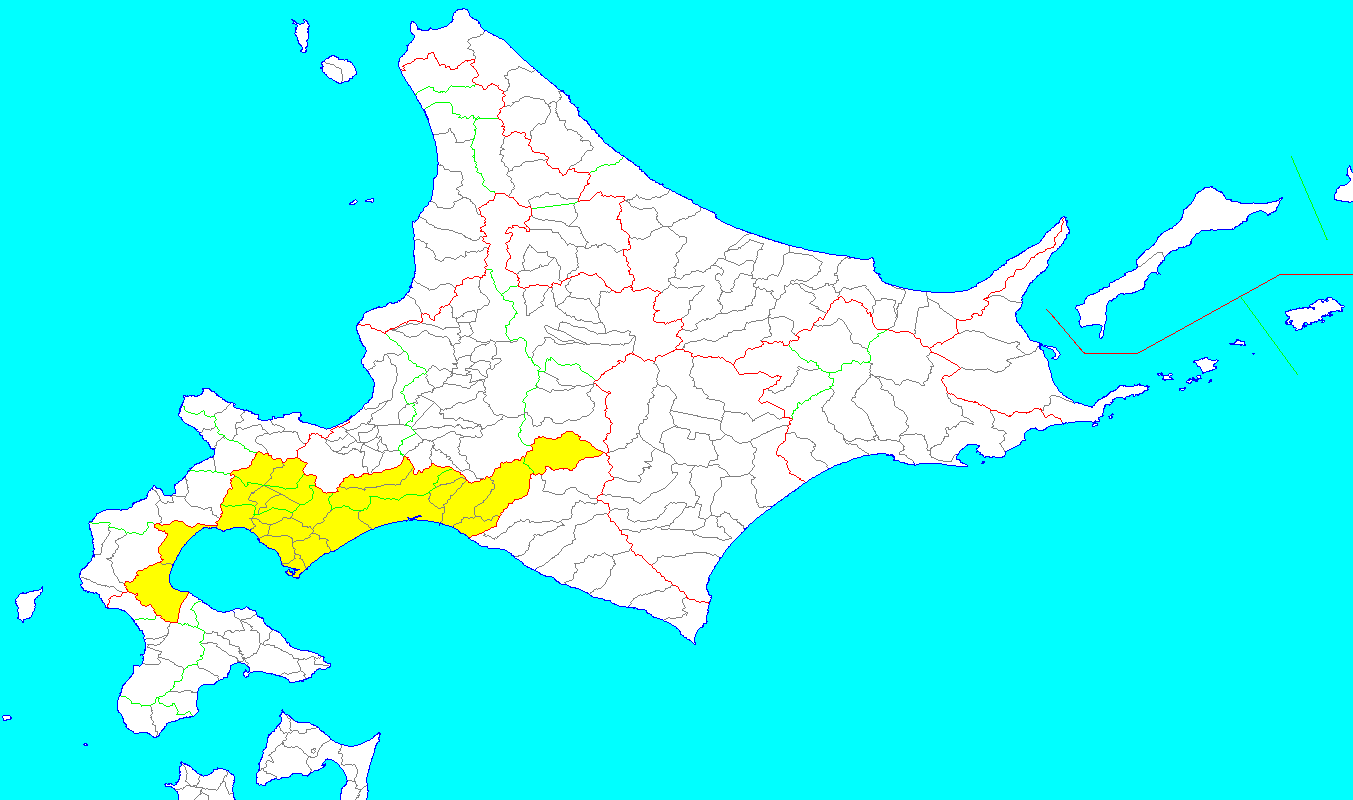
Location of Iburi Province c. 1869.

Iburi Province (胆振国, Iburi no Kuni; Japanese pronunciation: [í.bɯ̈̀.ɾʲì (nò̞ kɯ̈̀.ɲ̟ì)]), also called Ifuri, was a short-lived province located in Hokkaidō. It corresponds to modern-day Iburi Subprefecture, Yamakoshi District of Oshima, Abuta District in Shiribeshi Subprefecture, the cities of Chitose and Eniwa in Ishikari Subprefecture and Shimukappu Village in Kamikawa Subprefecture.

== History ==
After 1869, the northern Japanese island was known as Hokkaido; and regional administrative subdivisions were identified, including Iburi Province.

In 1882, the Hokkaido region was separated into three prefectures — Hakodate Prefecture (函館県), Sapporo Prefecture (札幌県), and Nemuro Prefecture (根室県). In 1886, the three prefectures were abolished, and Hokkaido was put under the Hokkaido Agency (北海道庁). At the same time, Iburi Province continued to exist for some purposes. For example, Iburi is explicitly recognized in treaties in 1894 (a) between Japan and the United States and (b) between Japan and the United Kingdom.

=== Timeline ===
- 1869—use of the name Hokkaido started
- August 15, 1869 Iburi Province established with 8 districts
- 1872 Census shows a population of 6,251
- 1882—prefectures established
- 1886—Hokkaido Agency established
- 1947—Hokkaido Prefecture established

== Districts ==
- Yamakoshi (山越郡)
- Abuta District (虻田郡)
- Usu (有珠郡)
- Muroran (室蘭郡) Dissolved February 1, 1918 when four towns and villages merged to form Muroran-ku
- Yoribetsu (幌別郡) Dissolved August 1, 1970 when Noboribetsu Town became Noboribetsu City
- Shiraoi (白老郡)
- Yūfutsu (勇払郡)
- Chitose (千歳郡) Dissolved November 11, 1970 when Eniwa Town became a city

== Other websites ==
Media related to Iburi Province at Wikimedia Commons

- Murdoch's map of provinces, 1903
