= 733 series =

Japanese train type

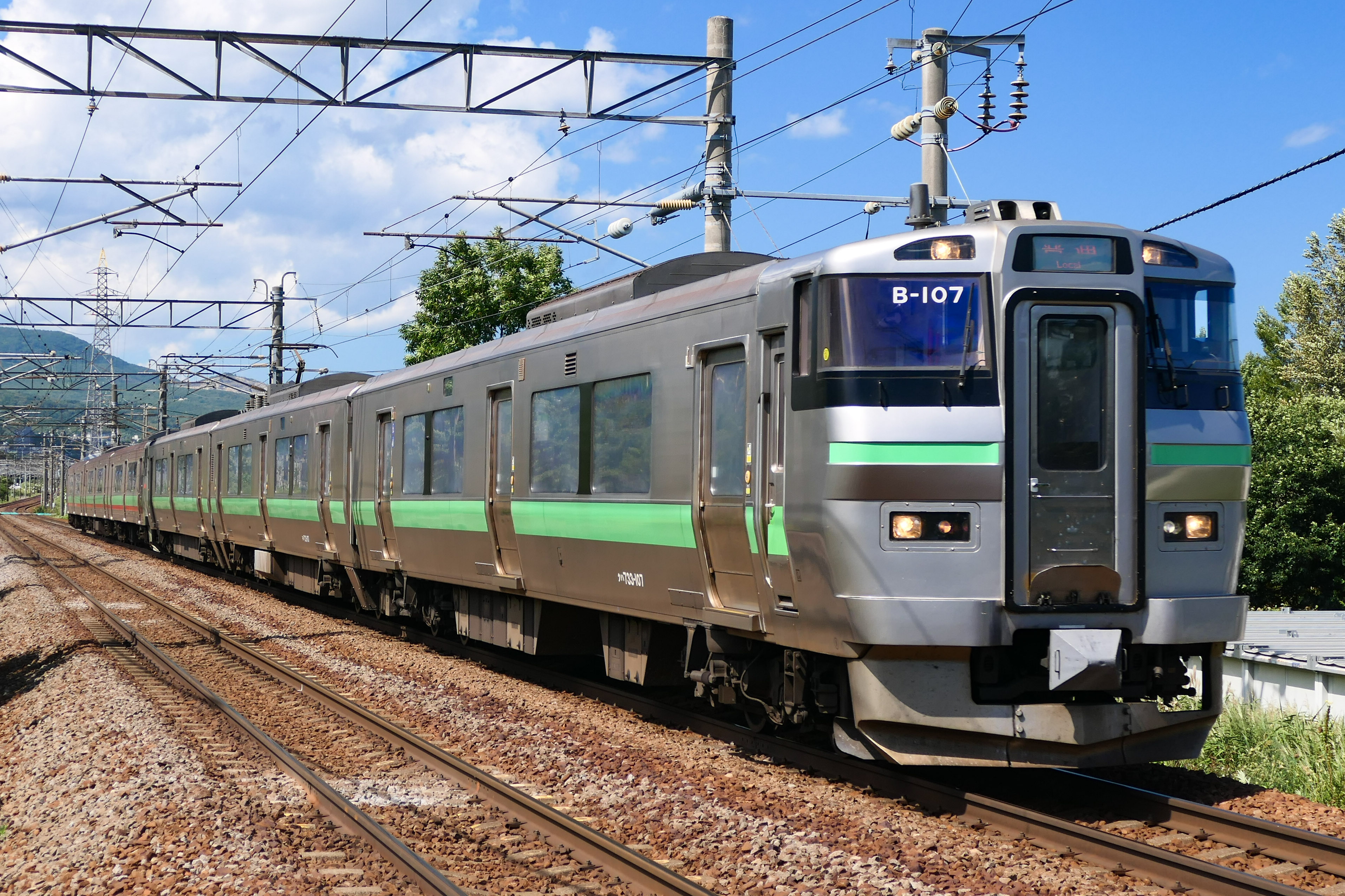
- Set B-107 on a Hakodate Main Line local service, August 2024
- In service: 1 June 2012 – present
- Manufacturer: Kawasaki Heavy Industries
- Built at: Kobe
- Replaced: 721 series
- Constructed: 2012–2018, 2024–
- Number built: 183 vehicles (43 sets) as of August 2025
- Number in service: 105 vehicles (28 sets) as of 1 October 2015
- Formation: 3/6 cars per trainset
- Fleet numbers: B-101 – B-121; B-1001 – B-1004; B-3101/3201 – B-3111/3211; B-4101/4201 –
- Operator: JR Hokkaido
- Depot: Sapporo
- Lines served: Hakodate Main Line, Sasshō Line

Specifications
- Car body construction: Stainless steel
- Car length: 21,200 mm (69 ft 7 in) (end cars); 20,800 mm (68 ft 3 in) (intermediate cars)
- Width: 2,892 mm (9 ft 5.9 in)
- Floor height: 1,050 mm (3 ft 5 in)
- Doors: 3 per side
- Maximum speed: 130 km/h (81 mph) (design); 120 km/h (75 mph) (service)
- Traction system: N-MT731A
- Power output: 230 kW (310 hp) per motor
- Acceleration: 2.2 km/(h⋅s) (1.4 mph/s)
- Electric system: 20 kV AC (overhead catenary)
- Current collection: N-PS785 single-arm pantograph
- Bogies: N-DT733 (motored), N-TR733 (trailer)
- Safety system: ATS-DN
- Multiple working: 721 series, 731 series, 735 series
- Track gauge: 1,067 mm (3 ft 6 in)

The 733 series (733系) is an electric multiple unit (EMU) train type operated by Hokkaido Railway Company (JR Hokkaido) on suburban services in the Sapporo area of Hokkaido, Japan, since 1 June 2012.

== Variants ==
- 733-0 series: 3-car sets operated since June 2012
- 733-1000 series: 3-car sets operated on Hakodate Liner shinkansen access services since March 2016
- 733-3000 series: 6-car sets operated on Airport rapid services since July 2014
- 733-4000 series: 6-car sets operated on Airport rapid services since October 2024

== Design ==
Similar in appearance to the aluminium-bodied 735 series EMUs built in 2010, the 733 series EMUs have stainless steel bodies with steel driving cab ends. At 2,892 mm (9 ft 5 7/8 in), the 733 series cars are also wider than the 731 series and 735 series cars, which are 2,800 mm (9 ft 2 1/4 in) wide. Sets B-113 onward, delivered from September 2013, feature full-colour LED destination indicators, instead of the three-colour indicators used on earlier sets.

Five new six-car sets, classified "733-3000 series", were delivered in 2014 and phased in on Airport rapid services between Sapporo and New Chitose Airport from July, operating alongside the existing 721 series EMUs, and allowing the withdrawal of the remaining 711 series EMUs still in service. These sets include a "u Seat" car with unidirectional reclining seating for reserved seat passengers. The new sets feature LED lighting in the passenger areas.

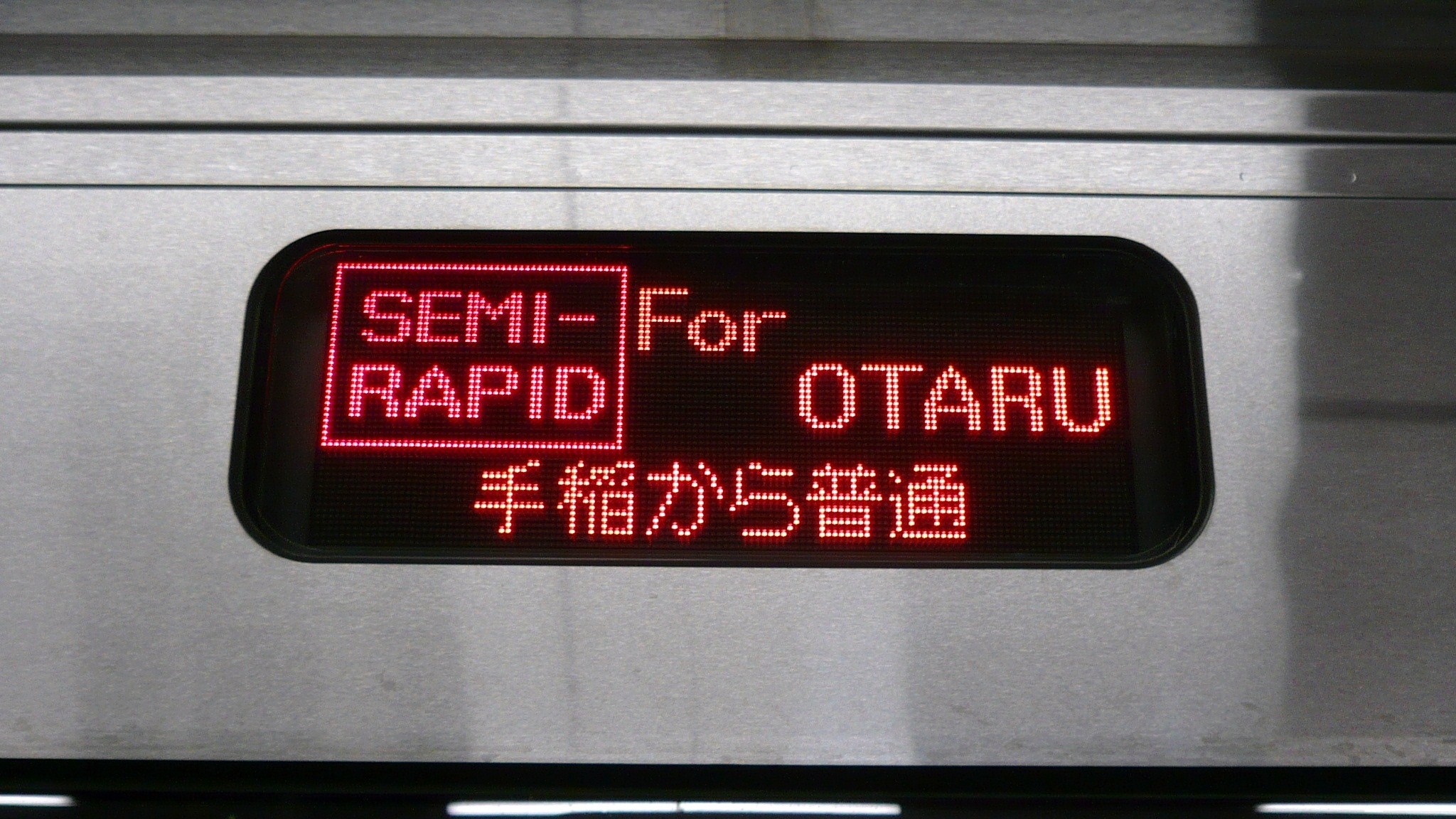
3-colour LED destination indicator showing bilingual display, August 2012

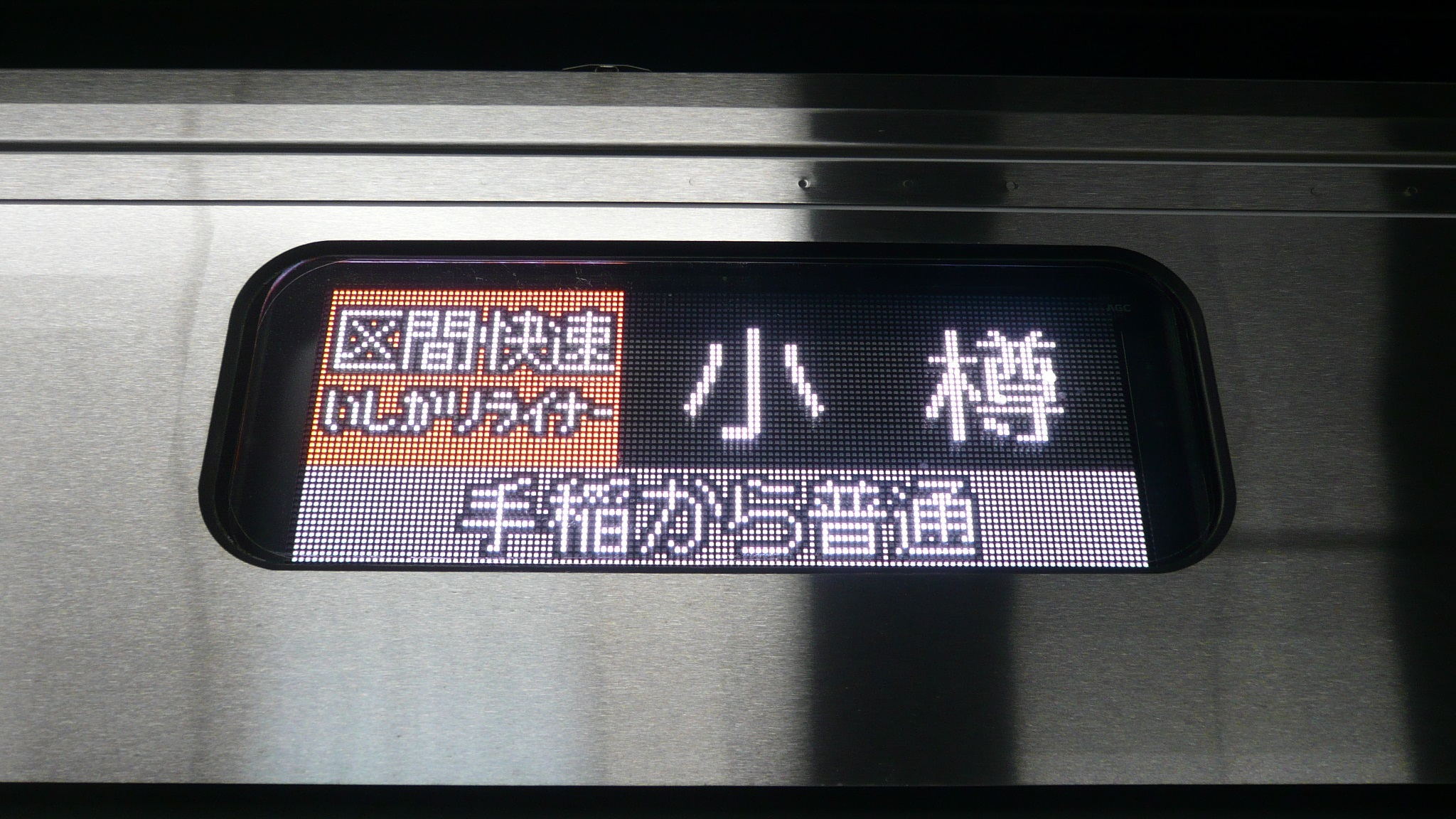
Full-colour LED destination indicator on set B-116, November 2013

== Operations ==
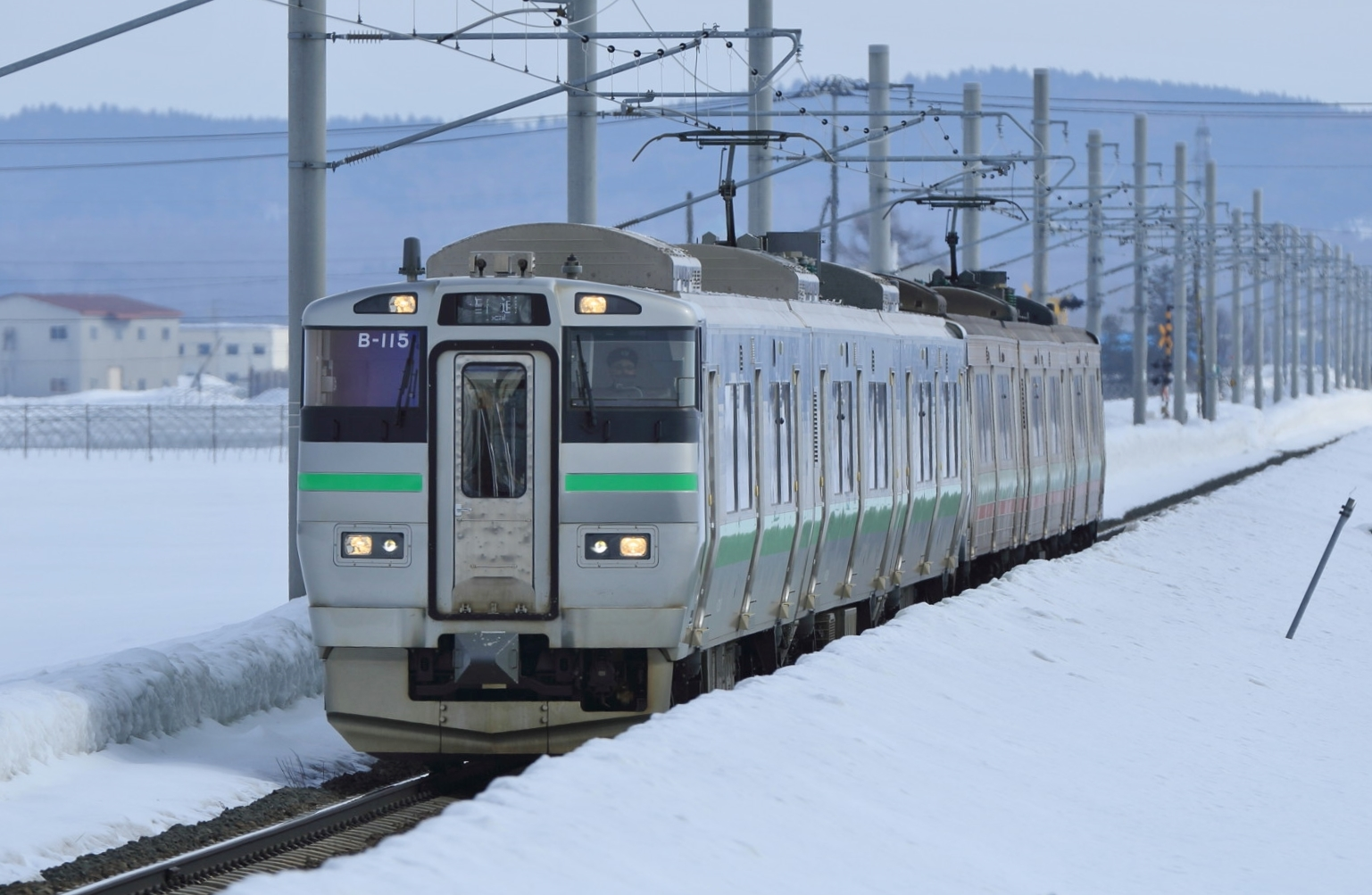
733 series 3-car set B-115 running in multiple with a 731 series set on the Sasshō Line, March 2014

The 733 series sets entered service from 1 June 2012 on suburban services in the Sapporo area of Hokkaido, including the newly electrified Sasshō Line. They are capable of running in multiple with 721 series, 731 series, and 735 series EMUs. However, unlike the 731 series, they cannot operate in multiple with the KiHa 201 series DMUs also used on the Sasshō Line.

== Formations ==
As of 1 October 2015, the fleet consists of 21 three-car sets, numbered B-101 to B-121, and seven six-car 733-3000 series sets, numbered B-3101 to B-3107, formed as shown below, with one motored ("M") intermediate car and two non-powered trailer ("T") cars. Car 1 is at the Takikawa/Tomakomai end.

=== 3-car sets (B-101 – B-121) ===
Car No.	1	2	3
Designation	Tc1	M	Tc2
Numbering	KuHa 733-100	MoHa 733-100	KuHa 733-200
Weight (t)	33.9	43.1	35.5
Capacity (total/seated)	139/46	154/52	146/50

- Car 1 has a universal access toilet.
- Car 2 is fitted with an N-PS785 single-arm pantograph.

=== 3-car 733-1000 series sets (B-1001 – B-1004) ===
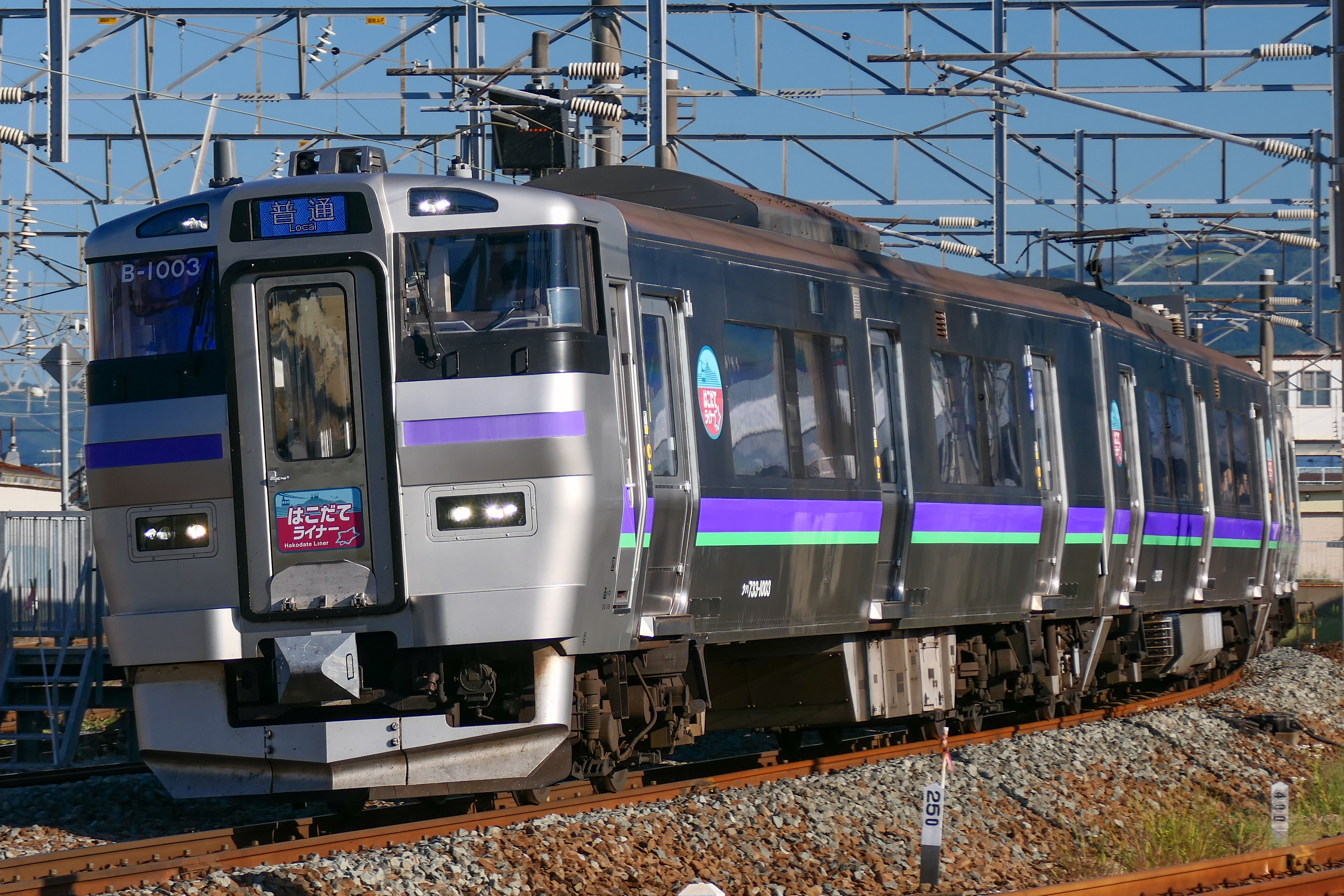
733-1000 series set B1003 on a Hakodate Liner service in September 2022

The fleet of four three-car 733-1000 series sets are formed as shown below, with car 1 at the Hakodate end.

Car No.	1	2	3
Designation	Tc1	M	Tc2
Numbering	KuHa 733-1000	MoHa 733-1000	KuHa 733-2000
Weight (t)	34.2	41.9	35.5
Capacity (total/seated)	138/46	156/52	145/50

- Car 1 has a universal access toilet.
- Car 2 is fitted with a single-arm pantograph.
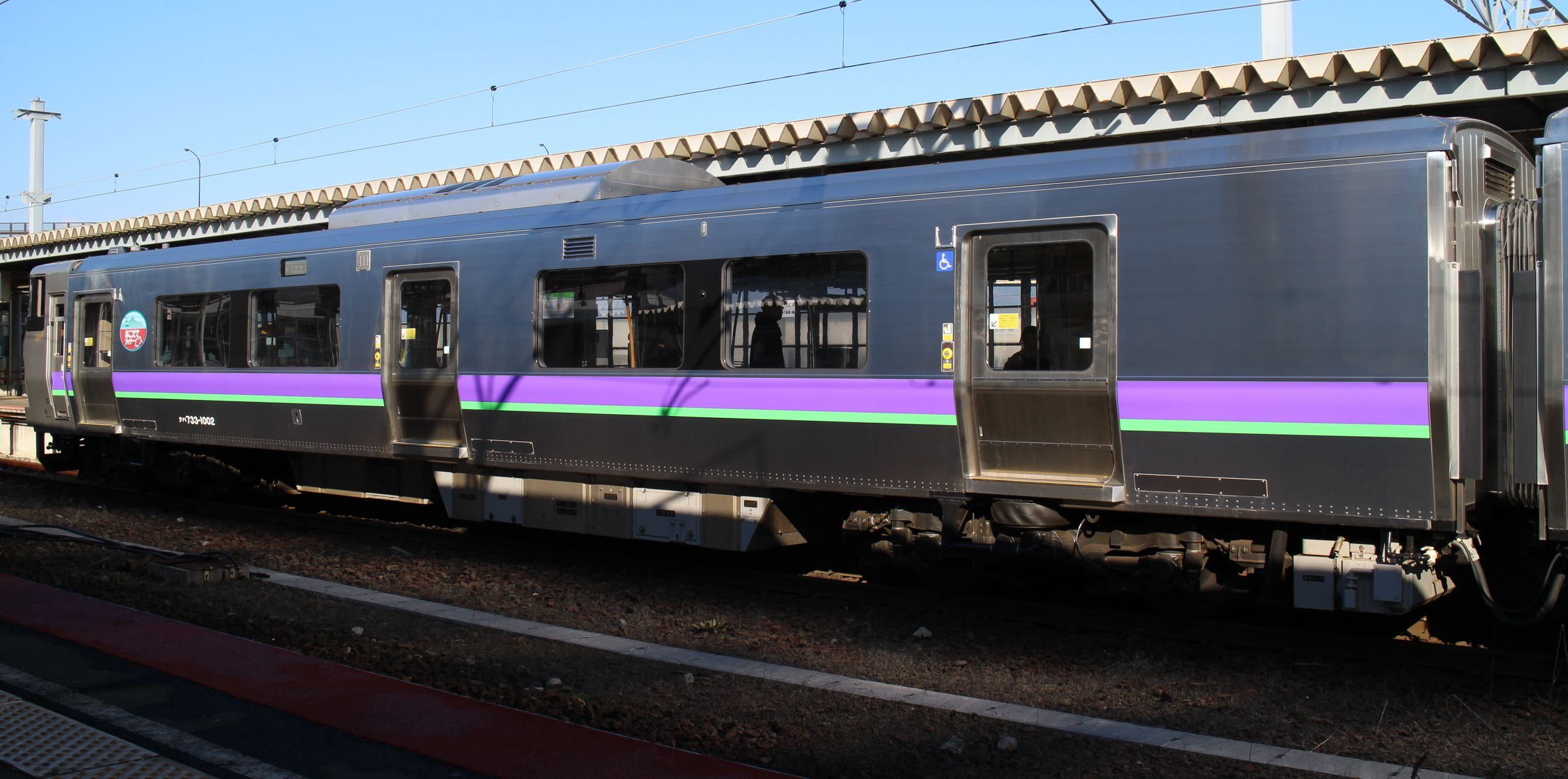
KuHa 733-1002 of set B1002

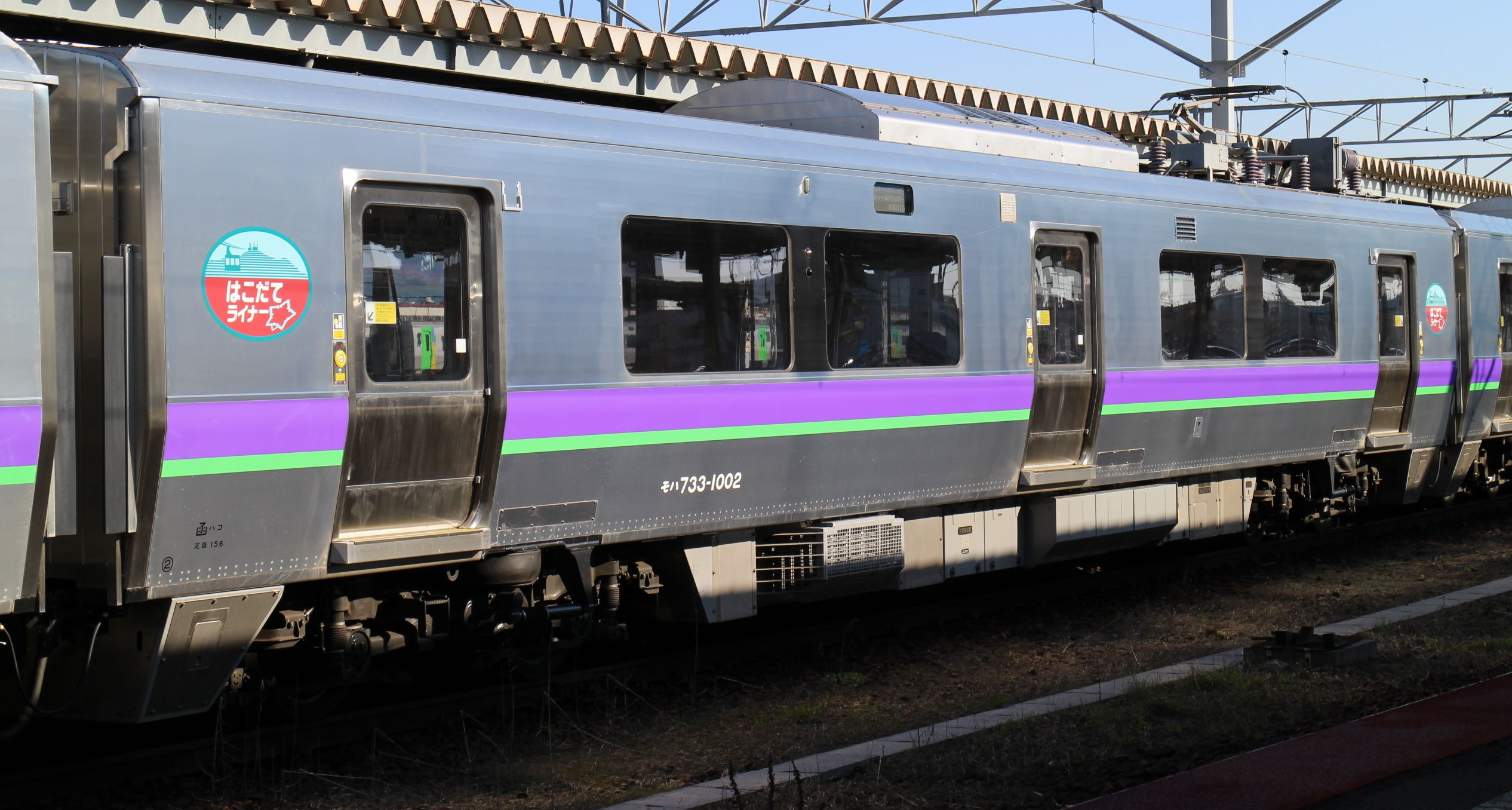
MoHa 733-1002 of set B1002

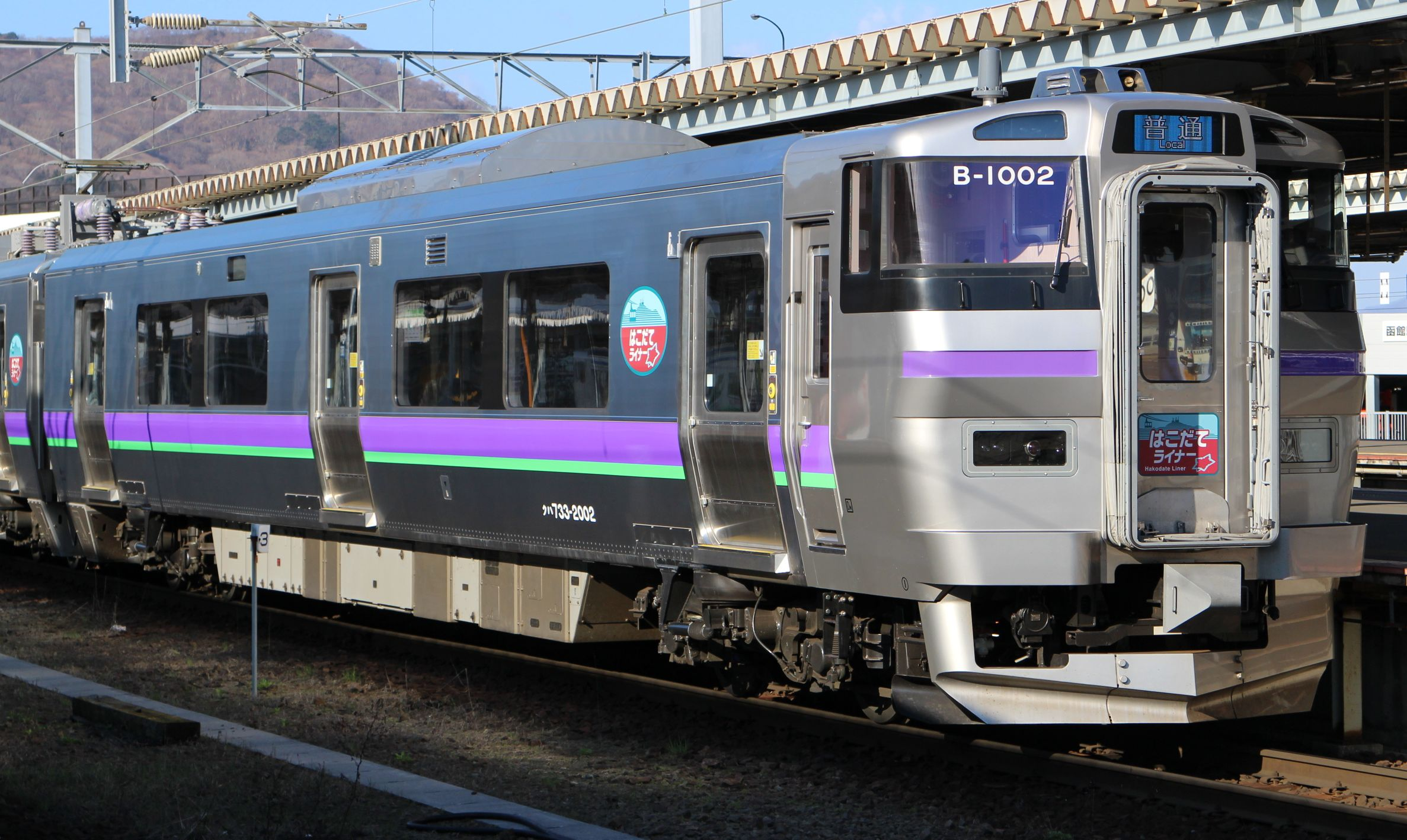
KuHa 733-2002 of set B1002

=== 6-car 733-3000 series sets (B-3101/3201 – B-3107/3207) ===
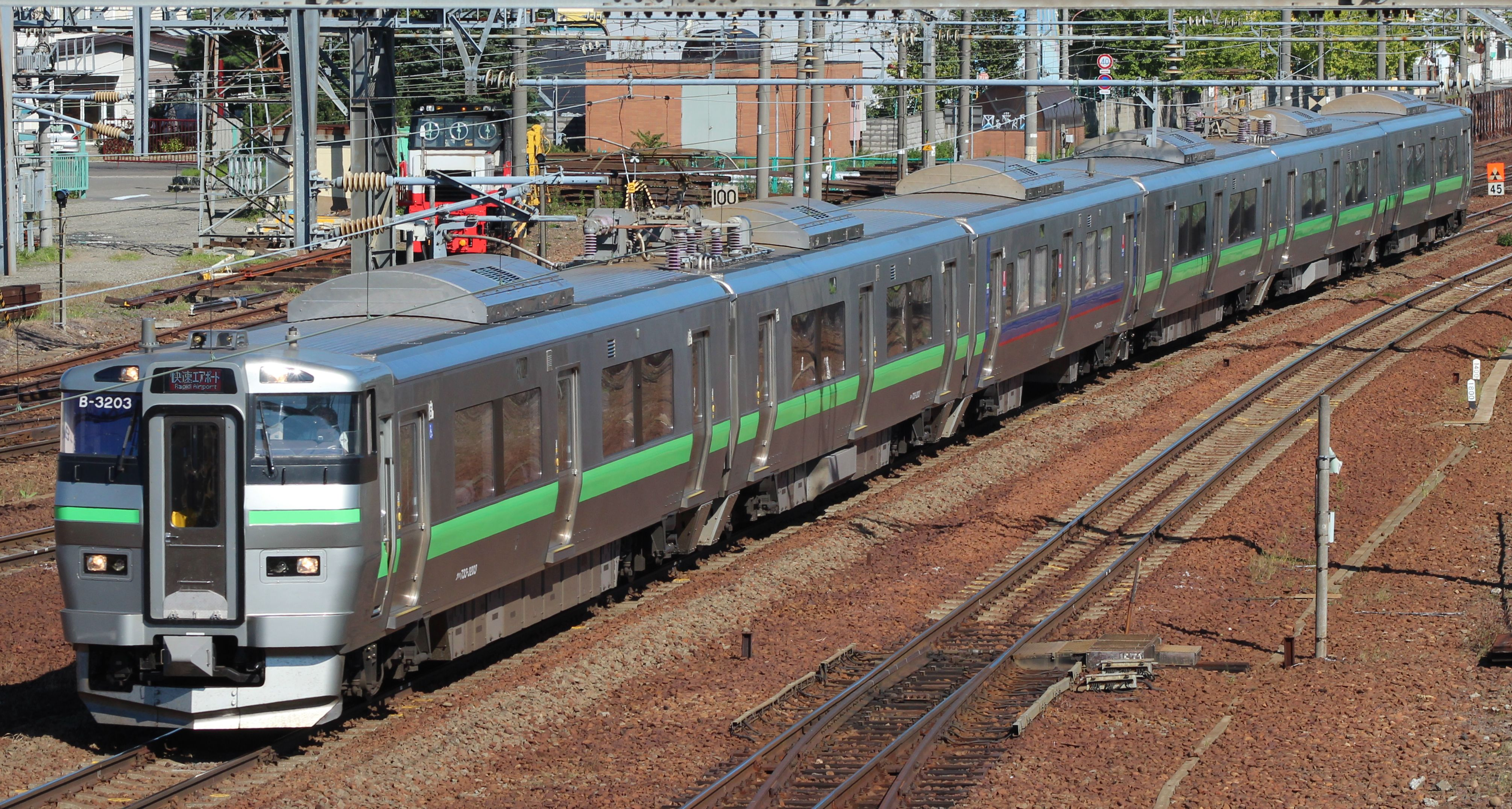
6-car set B-3103/3203, September 2014

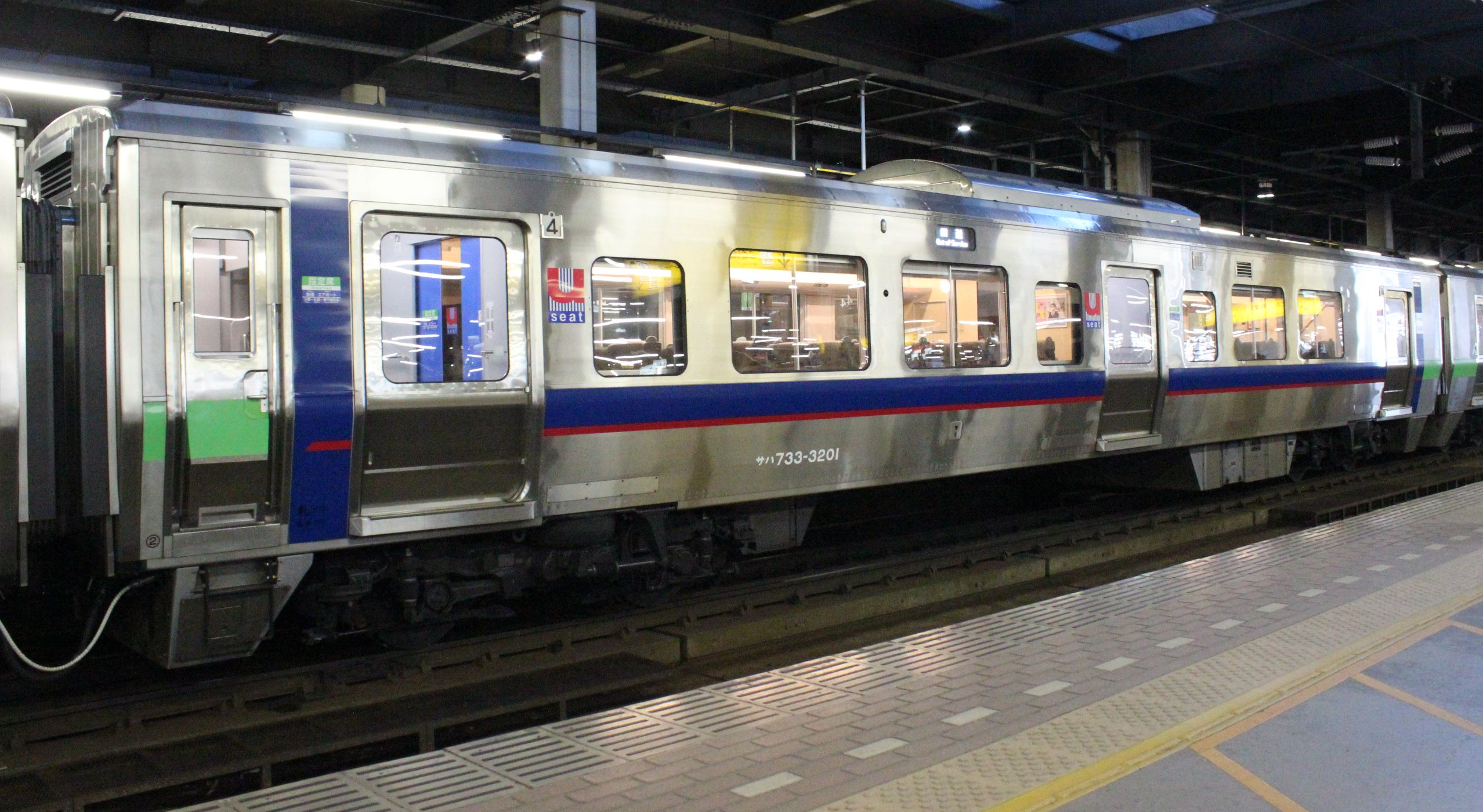
"u Seat" car SaHa 733-3201 in September 2014

Seven six-car 733-3000 series sets are formed as shown below with two motored ("M") cars and four non-powered trailer ("T") cars. The sets each consist of two 3-car half sets, numbered "B-310x" and "B-320x", with car 1 at the New Chitose Airport end.

Car No.	1	2	3	4	5	6
Designation	Tc1	M	T	Tu	M	Tc2
Numbering	KuHa 733-3100	MoHa 733-3100	SaHa 733-3100	SaHa 733-3200	MoHa 733-3200	KuHa 733-3200
Weight (t)	33.7	41.8	34.0	31.8	41.8	35.3
Capacity (total/seated)	142/46	156/52	149/48	72/43	156/52	146/47

- Car 4 has "u Seat" unidirectional reclining seating.
- Car 1 has a toilet, and car 3 has a universal access toilet.
- Cars 2 and car 5 are each fitted with an N-PS785 single-arm pantograph.

== Interior ==
The 3-car sets have longitudinal bench seating throughout, with a total capacity of 439 (148 seated).

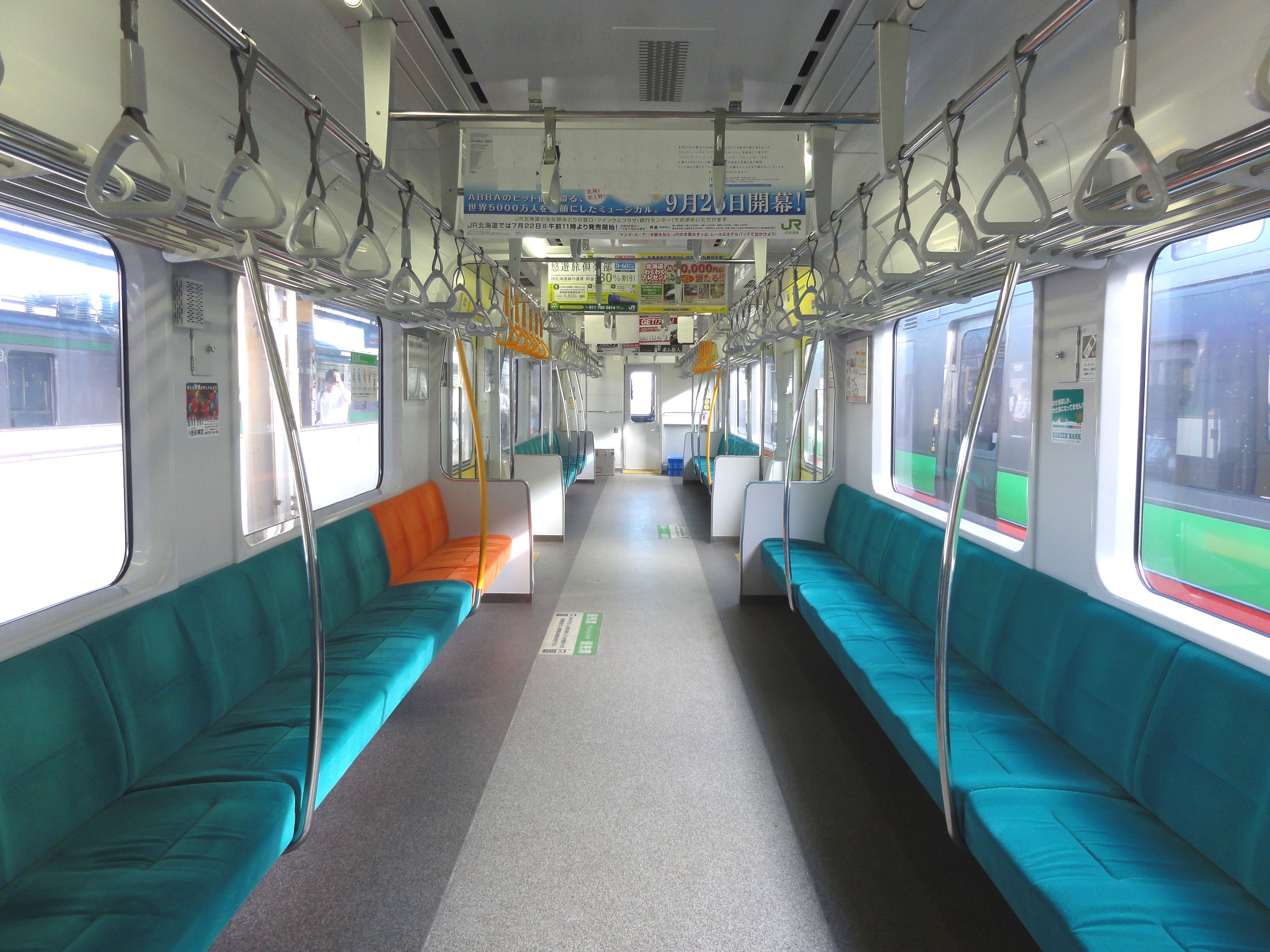
Interior view, showing priority seats highlighted in orange, September 2012

== Bogies ==
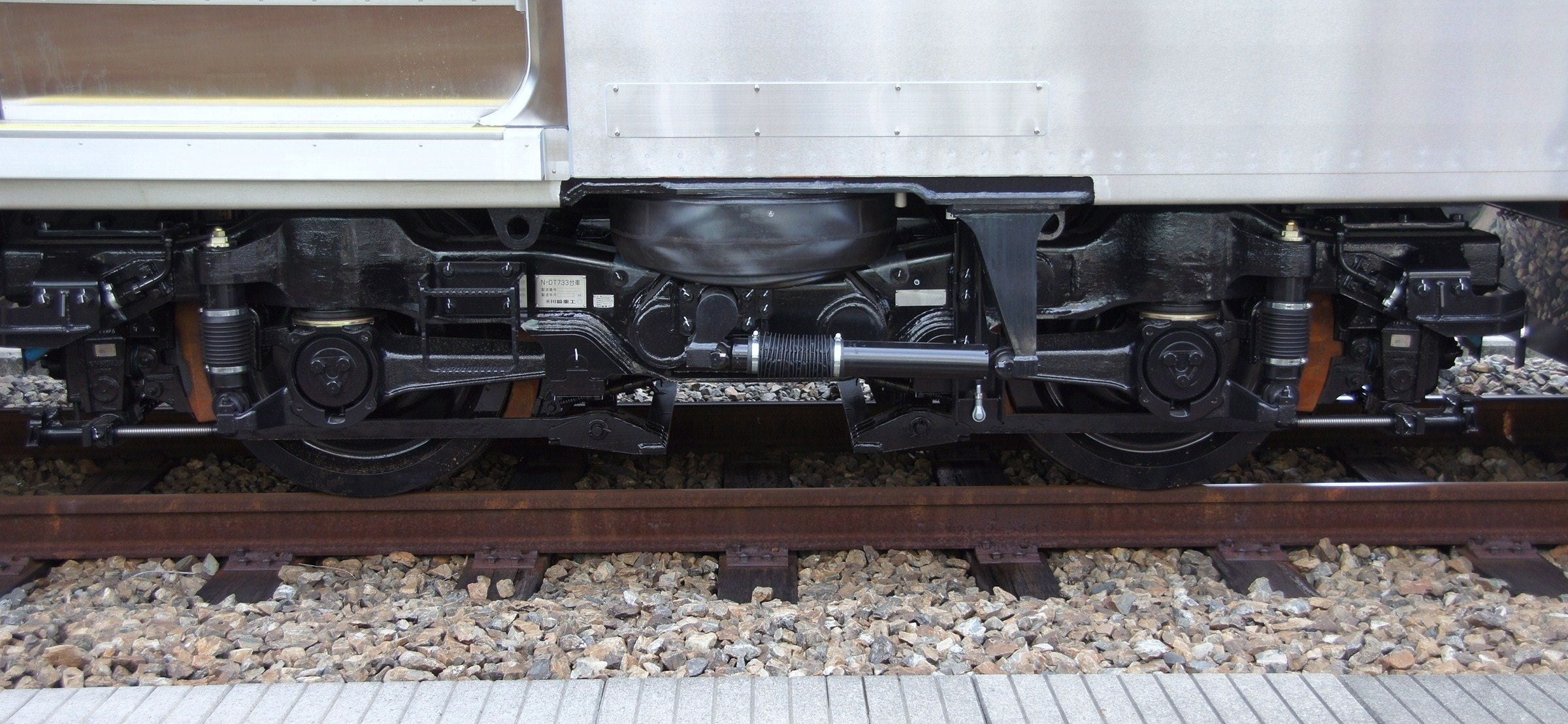
N-DT733 motor bogie

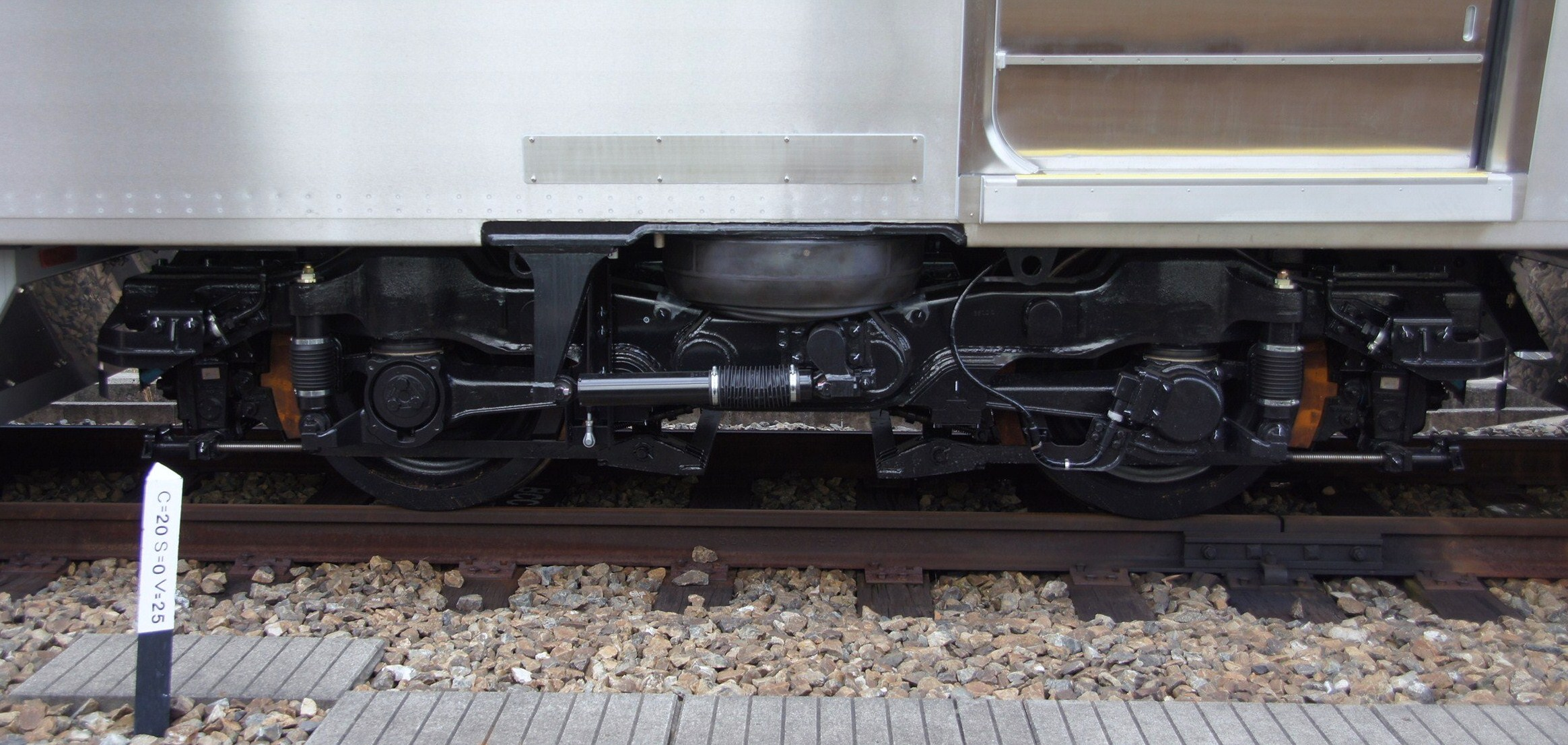
N-TR733 trailer bogie

== History ==
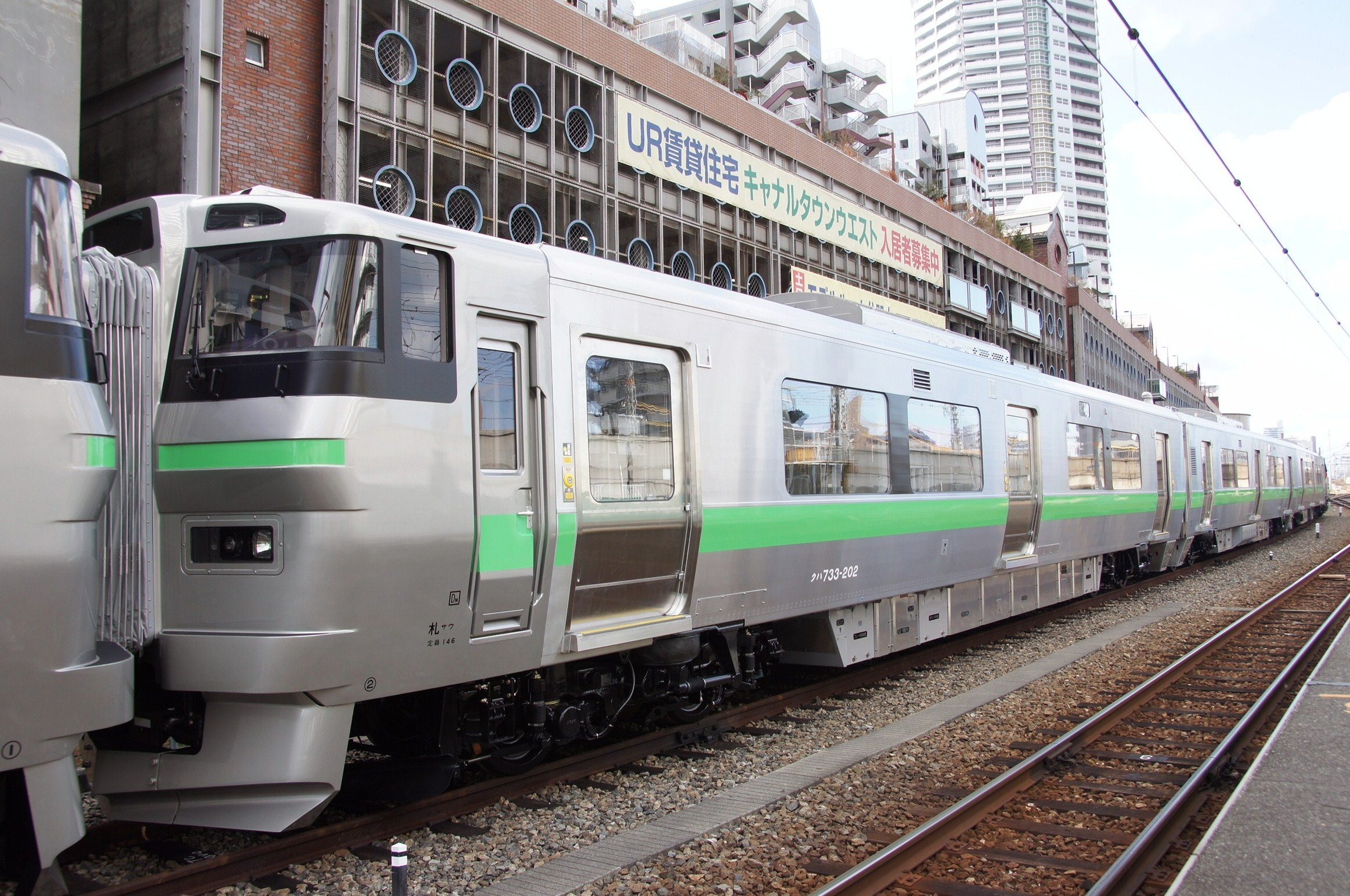
Set B-102 at Hyogo Station on delivery, February 2012

The first two 3-car sets, B-101 and B-102, were delivered from the Kawasaki Heavy Industries factory in Kobe in February 2012, with two more sets, B-103 and B-104, delivered later the same month. Twelve more sets (36 vehicles) are scheduled to be delivered during fiscal 2014.

The first 733-3000 series six-car sets entered service on 19 July 2014.

The first two 733-1000 series three-car sets, B-1001 and B-1002, were delivered from the Kawasaki Heavy Industries factory in Kobe in October 2015.

The first two 733-4000 series six-car sets, B-4101/4201 and B-4102/4102, were delivered from the Kawasaki Heavy Industries factory in May 2024. These sets entered service from 25 October 2024, replacing ageing 721 series EMUs and allowing for additional capacity and frequency on Airport services.

== Build details ==
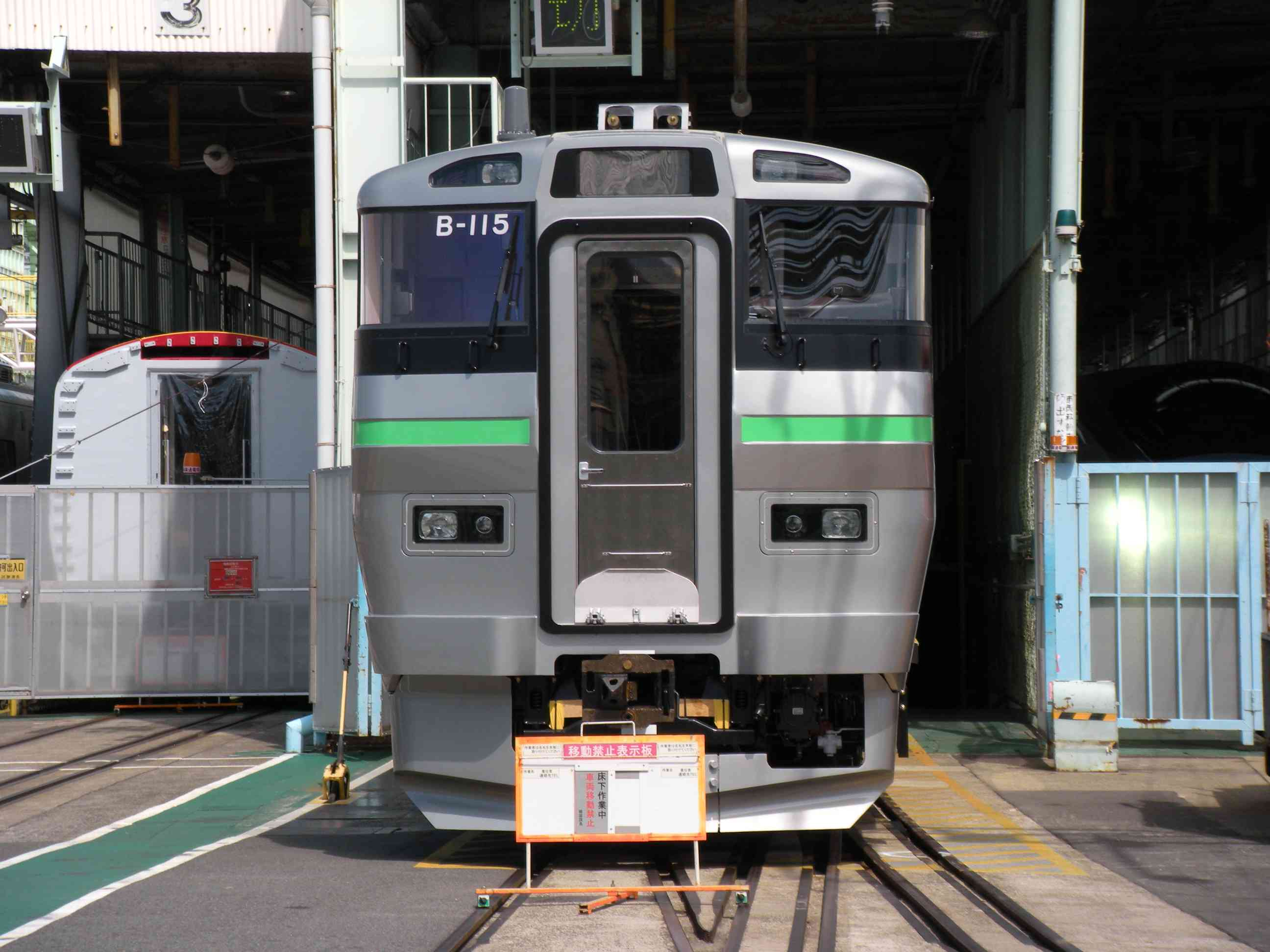
Set B-115 at the Kawasaki Heavy Industries factory in Kobe, September 2013

The official delivery dates for the fleet are as shown below.

Set No.	Manufacturer	Date delivered
B-101	Kawasaki Heavy Industries	10 March 2012
B-102	Kawasaki Heavy Industries	13 March 2012
B-103	Kawasaki Heavy Industries	15 March 2012
B-104	Kawasaki Heavy Industries	17 March 2012
B-105	Kawasaki Heavy Industries	10 May 2012
B-106	Kawasaki Heavy Industries	11 May 2012
B-107	Kawasaki Heavy Industries	12 May 2012
B-108	Kawasaki Heavy Industries	13 May 2012
B-109	Kawasaki Heavy Industries	22 August 2012
B-110	Kawasaki Heavy Industries	13 August 2012
B-111	Kawasaki Heavy Industries	20 August 2012
B-112	Kawasaki Heavy Industries	21 August 2012
B-113	Kawasaki Heavy Industries	18 September 2013
B-114	Kawasaki Heavy Industries	19 September 2013
B-115	Kawasaki Heavy Industries	16 October 2013
B-116	Kawasaki Heavy Industries	17 October 2013
B-117	Kawasaki Heavy Industries	18 October 2013
B-118	Kawasaki Heavy Industries	9 November 2013
B-119	Kawasaki Heavy Industries	10 November 2013
B-120	Kawasaki Heavy Industries	11 November 2014
B-121	Kawasaki Heavy Industries	12 November 2014
B-1001	Kawasaki Heavy Industries	2015
B-1002	Kawasaki Heavy Industries	2015
B-1003	Kawasaki Heavy Industries	2015
B-1004	Kawasaki Heavy Industries	2015
B-3101/3201	Kawasaki Heavy Industries	24 June 2014
B-3102/3202	Kawasaki Heavy Industries	4 July 2014
B-3103/3203	Kawasaki Heavy Industries	6 August 2014
B-3104/3204	Kawasaki Heavy Industries	7 August 2014
B-3105/3205	Kawasaki Heavy Industries	18 October 2014
B-3106/3206	Kawasaki Heavy Industries	17 June 2015
B-3107/3207	Kawasaki Heavy Industries	2 July 2015
B-3108/3208	Kawasaki Heavy Industries	8 May 2018
B-3109/3209	Kawasaki Heavy Industries	10 May 2018
B-3110/3210	Kawasaki Heavy Industries	5 June 2018
B-3111/3211	Kawasaki Heavy Industries	7 June 2018
B-4101/4201	Kawasaki Heavy Industries	May 2024
B-4102/4202	Kawasaki Heavy Industries	May 2024
B-4103/4203	Kawasaki Heavy Industries	October 2024
B-4104/4204	Kawasaki Heavy Industries	October 2024
B-4105/4205	Kawasaki Heavy Industries	June 2025
B-4106/4206	Kawasaki Heavy Industries	June 2025
B-4107/4207	Kawasaki Heavy Industries	August 2025
