= 731 series =

Japanese train type

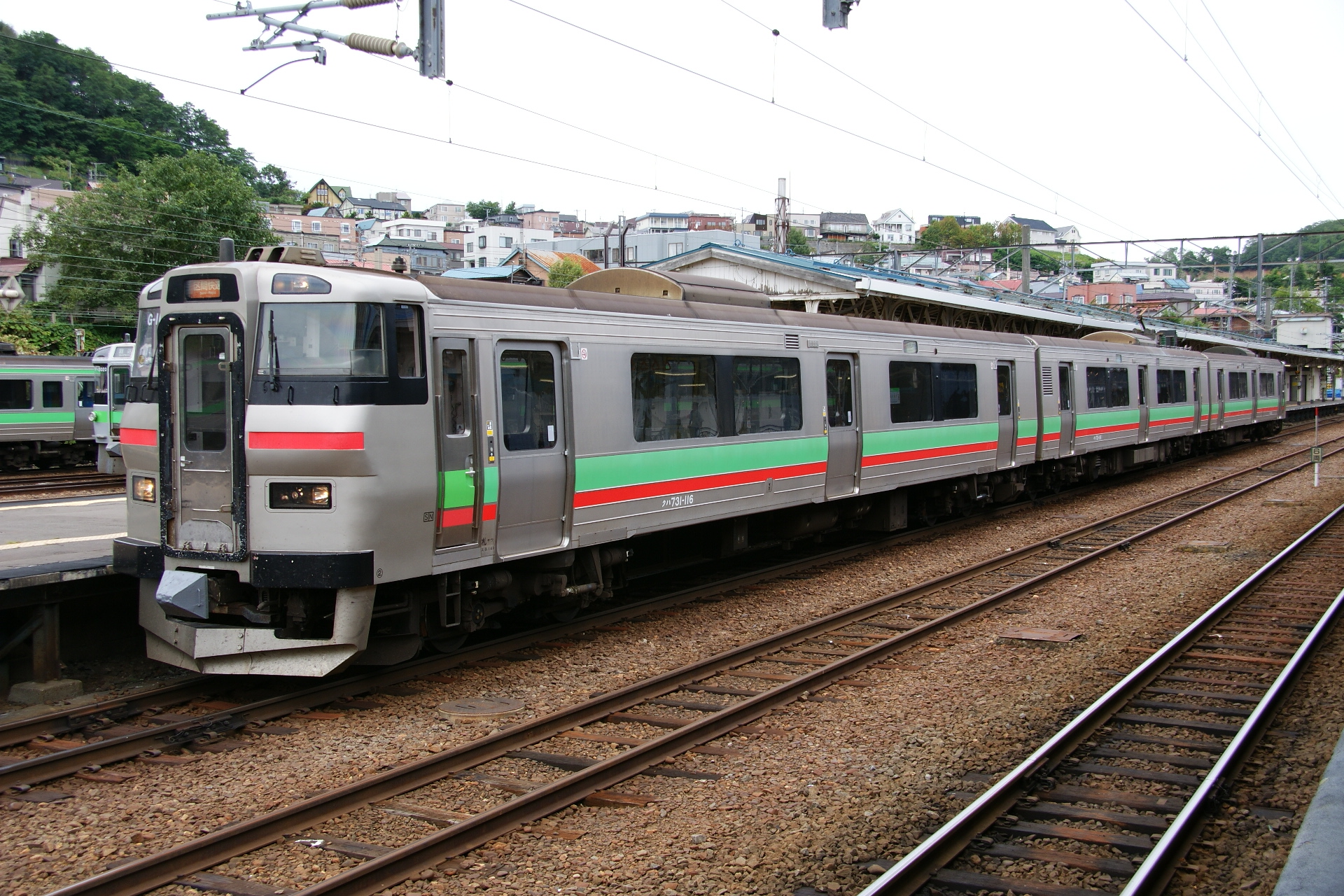
- 731 series set G-116 in August 2009
- Manufacturer: Kawasaki Heavy Industries, Hitachi
- Replaced: 711 series
- Constructed: 1996–2006
- Entered service: 24 December 1996
- Number built: 63 vehicles (21 sets)
- Number in service: 63 vehicles (21 sets)
- Formation: 3 cars per trainset
- Fleet numbers: G-101–121
- Operators: JR Hokkaido
- Depots: Sapporo
- Lines served: Hakodate Main Line, Chitose Line

Specifications
- Car body construction: Stainless steel
- Car length: 21,670 mm (71 ft 1 in) (end cars); 21,300 mm (69 ft 11 in) (intermediate cars)
- Width: 2,800 mm (9 ft 2 in)
- Height: 3,620 mm (11 ft 11 in)
- Doors: 3 per side
- Maximum speed: 130 km/h (81 mph)
- Electric system(s): 20 kV 50 Hz AC (overhead line)
- Current collection: Pantograph
- Multiple working: 721 series, 733 series, 735 series, KiHa 201 series
- Track gauge: 1,067 mm (3 ft 6 in)

The 731 series (731系) is an AC electric multiple unit (EMU) train type operated by Hokkaido Railway Company (JR Hokkaido) on Sapporo area suburban services in Hokkaido, Japan since 1996.

== Formation ==
As of 1 October 2016, 21 three-car sets are in service, numbered G-101 to G121, and based at Sapporo Depot. The trainsets are formed as follows, with one motored intermediate car and two non-powered driving trailer cars.

Car No.	1	2	3
Designation	Tc'	M	Tc
Numbering	KuHa 731-100	MoHa 731-100	KuHa 731-200
Capacity (total/seated)	141/50	151/52	143/50

Car 2 is fitted with one N-PS785 single-arm pantograph.

731 Series units are commonly known to run together with older 721 Series units.

== Interior ==
Seating consists of longitudinal bench seating throughout, without the vestibule areas used on the earlier 721 series trains.

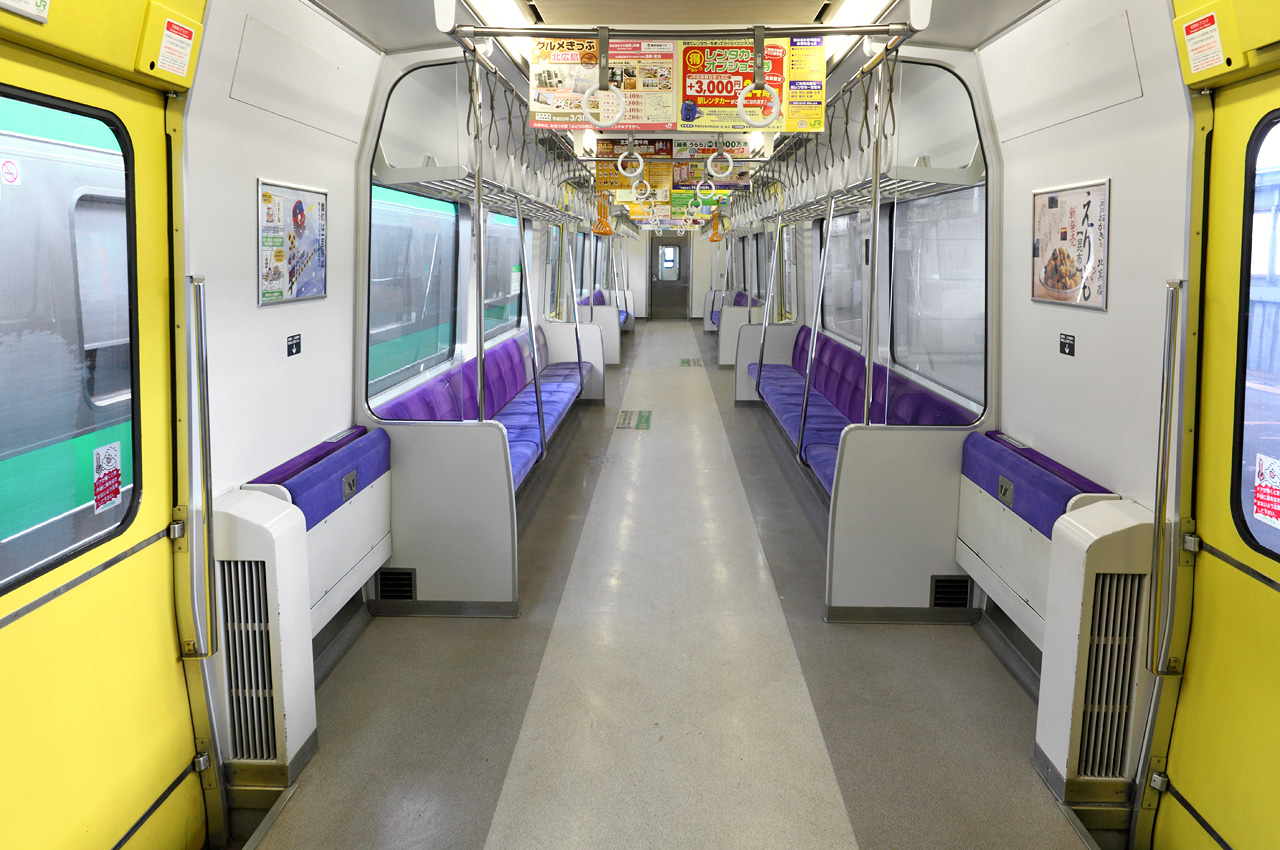
Interior view in February 2010

== History ==
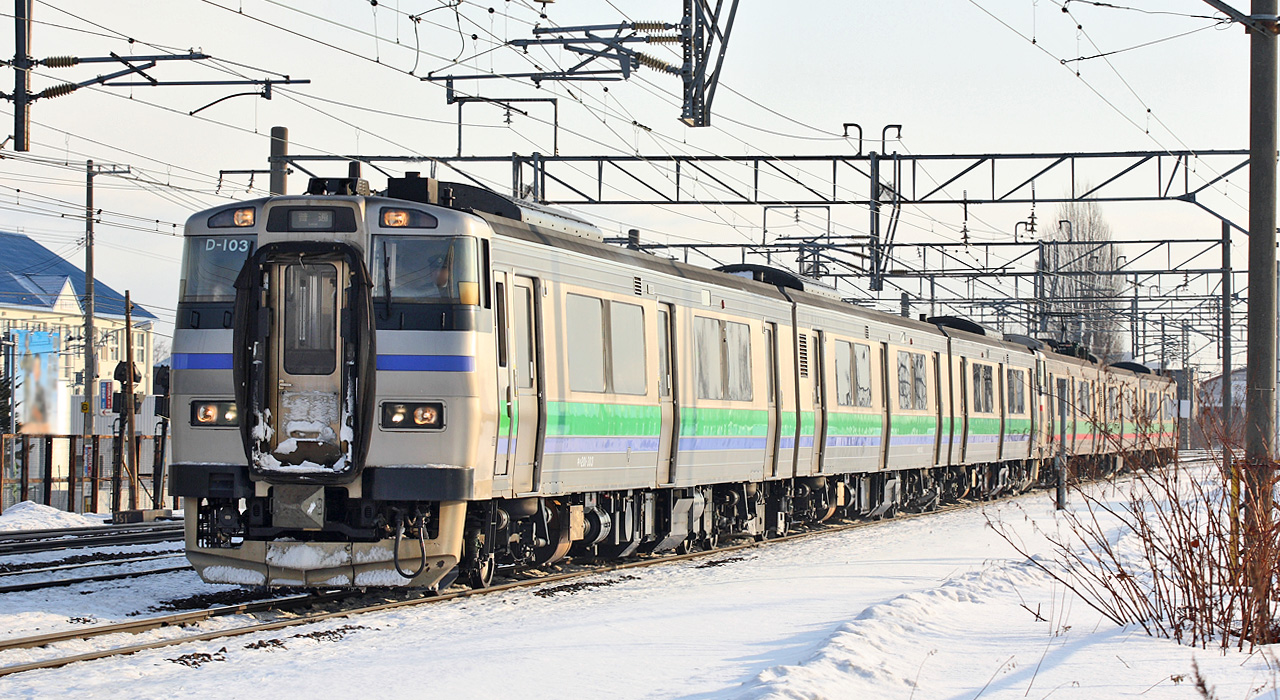
KiHa 201 series DMU running in multiple with a 731 series EMU, January 2009

A total of 63 vehicles (21 sets) were delivered to Sapporo Depot between 1996 and 2006. The first units entered service from 24 December 1996.

From the start of 22 March 1997 timetable revision, 731 series EMUs were operated in multiple with KiHa 201 series DMU sets over certain routes.

Polycarbonate window protectors were added in 2002, and the original pantographs were replaced with single-arm pantographs between 2004 and 2005.

== Fleet history ==
The individual build histories of the fleet are as follows.

Set No.	Manufacturer	Delivery date
G-101	Kawasaki Heavy Industries	12 December 1996
G-102	Kawasaki Heavy Industries	10 December 1996
G-103	Hitachi	13 December 1996
G-104	Hitachi	14 December 1996
G-105	Kawasaki Heavy Industries	23 February 1998
G-106	Kawasaki Heavy Industries	24 February 1998
G-107	Kawasaki Heavy Industries	24 February 1998
G-108	Kawasaki Heavy Industries	22 March 1998
G-109	Kawasaki Heavy Industries	23 March 1998
G-110	Kawasaki Heavy Industries	24 March 1998
G-111	Kawasaki Heavy Industries	16 December 1998
G-112	Kawasaki Heavy Industries	17 December 1998
G-113	Hitachi	18 December 1998
G-114	Hitachi	19 December 1998
G-115	Kawasaki Heavy Industries	20 December 1999
G-116	Kawasaki Heavy Industries	20 December 1999
G-117	Kawasaki Heavy Industries	21 December 1999
G-118	Hitachi	13 December 1999
G-119	Hitachi	13 December 1999
G-120	Kawasaki Heavy Industries	6 March 2006
G-121	Kawasaki Heavy Industries	5 March 2006
