= 735 series =

Japanese train type

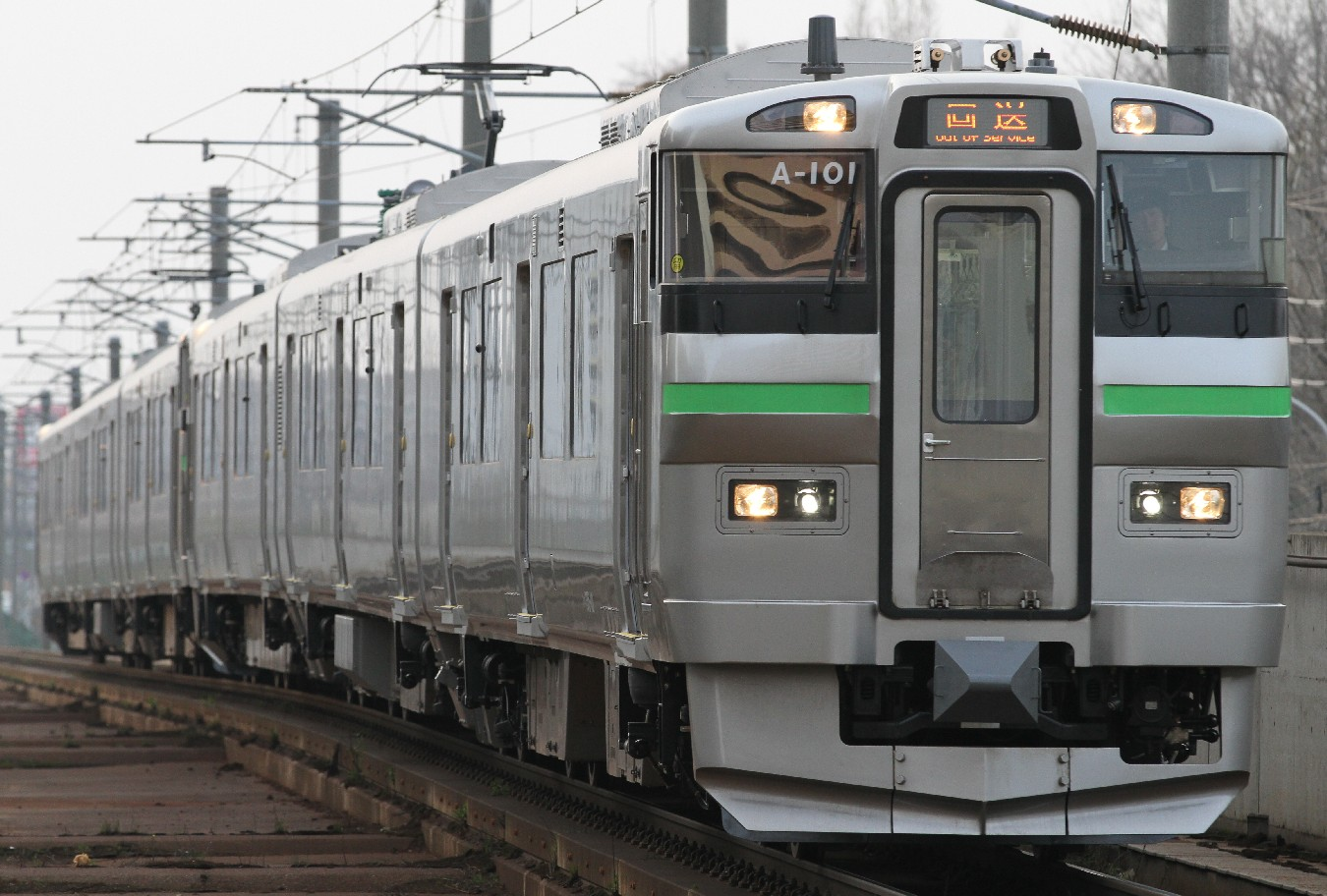
- Sets A-101 and A-102, May 2012
- In service: May 2012–present
- Manufacturer: Hitachi
- Built at: Kudamatsu
- Constructed: 2010
- Number built: 6 vehicles (2 sets)
- Number in service: 6 vehicles (2 sets)
- Formation: 3 cars per trainset
- Fleet numbers: A-101–102
- Capacity: 428 (148 seated)
- Operators: JR Hokkaido
- Depots: Sapporo

Specifications
- Car body construction: Aluminium alloy
- Car length: 21.2 m (69 ft 7 in) (end cars); 20.8 m (68 ft 3 in) (intermediate cars)
- Width: 2,800 mm (9 ft 2 in)
- Doors: 3 per side
- Maximum speed: 120 km/h (75 mph)
- Acceleration: 2.2 km/(h⋅s) (1.4 mph/s)
- Electric system(s): 20 kV AC
- Current collection: Overhead catenary
- Bogies: N-DT735 (motored), N-TR735 (trailer)
- Multiple working: 721 series, 731 series, 733 series
- Track gauge: 1,067 mm (3 ft 6 in)

The 735 series (735系) is an electric multiple unit (EMU) train type built in 2010 and operated by Hokkaido Railway Company (JR Hokkaido) on suburban services in the Sapporo area in Hokkaido, Japan, since May 2012.

== Design ==
The 735 series is intended as an experimental type to evaluate the suitability of aluminium-body rolling stock in the cold climate of Hokkaido. The cab ends however use steel construction. They were tested in winter conditions from 2010 to 2011.

The 735 series sets are able to run in multiple with the 721 series, 731 series, and 733 series suburban EMUs, but not with KiHa 201 series DMUs.

== Formation ==
Sets are formed as shown below.

Car No.	1	2	3
Designation	Tc1	M	Tc2
Numbering	KuHa 735-100	MoHa 735-100	KuHa 735-200
Weight (t)	31.8	40.1	33.3
Capacity (total/seated)	137/46	150/52	141/50

The MoHa 735 car is fitted with an N-PS785 single-arm pantograph.

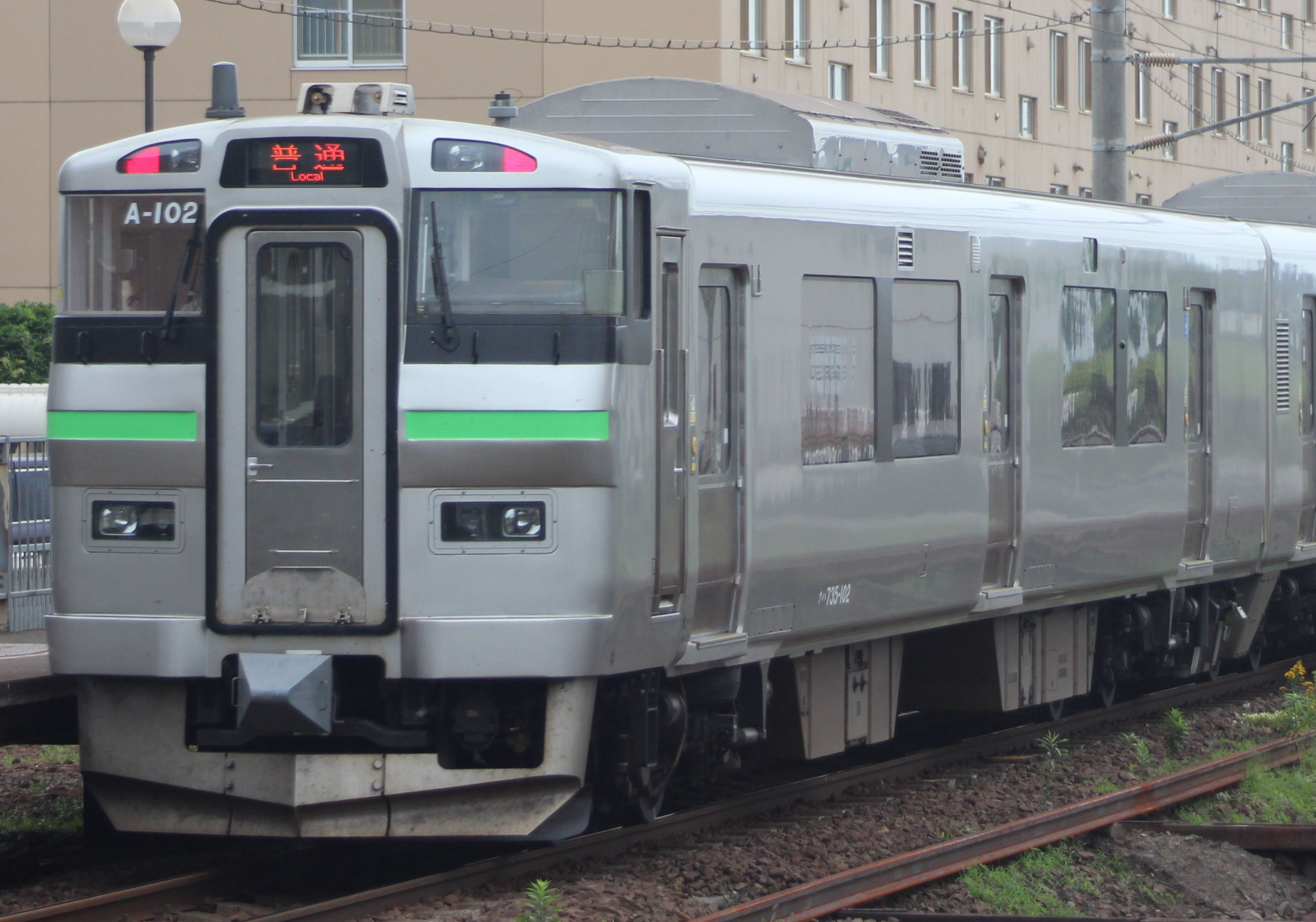
KuHa 735-102

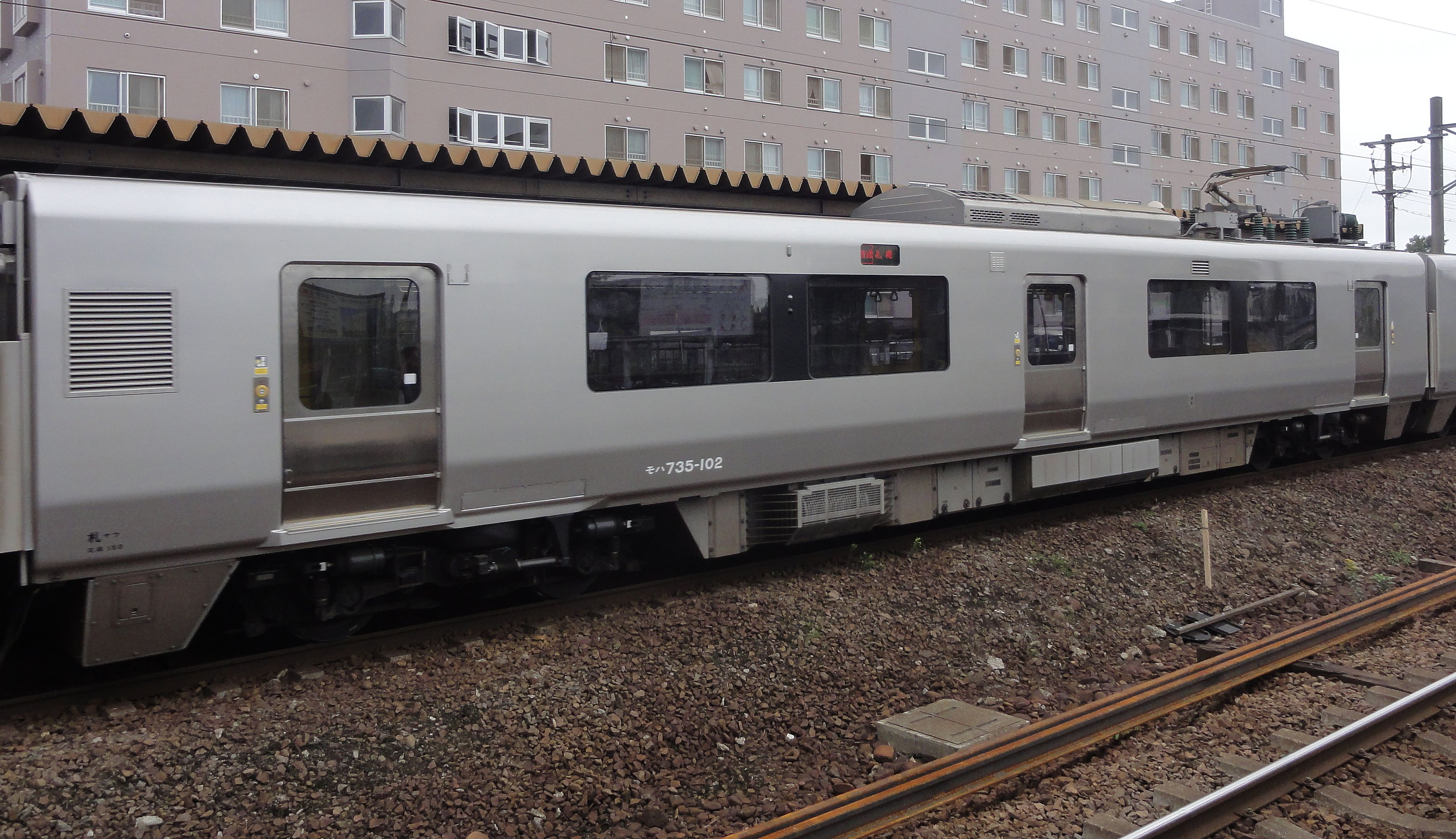
MoHa 735-102

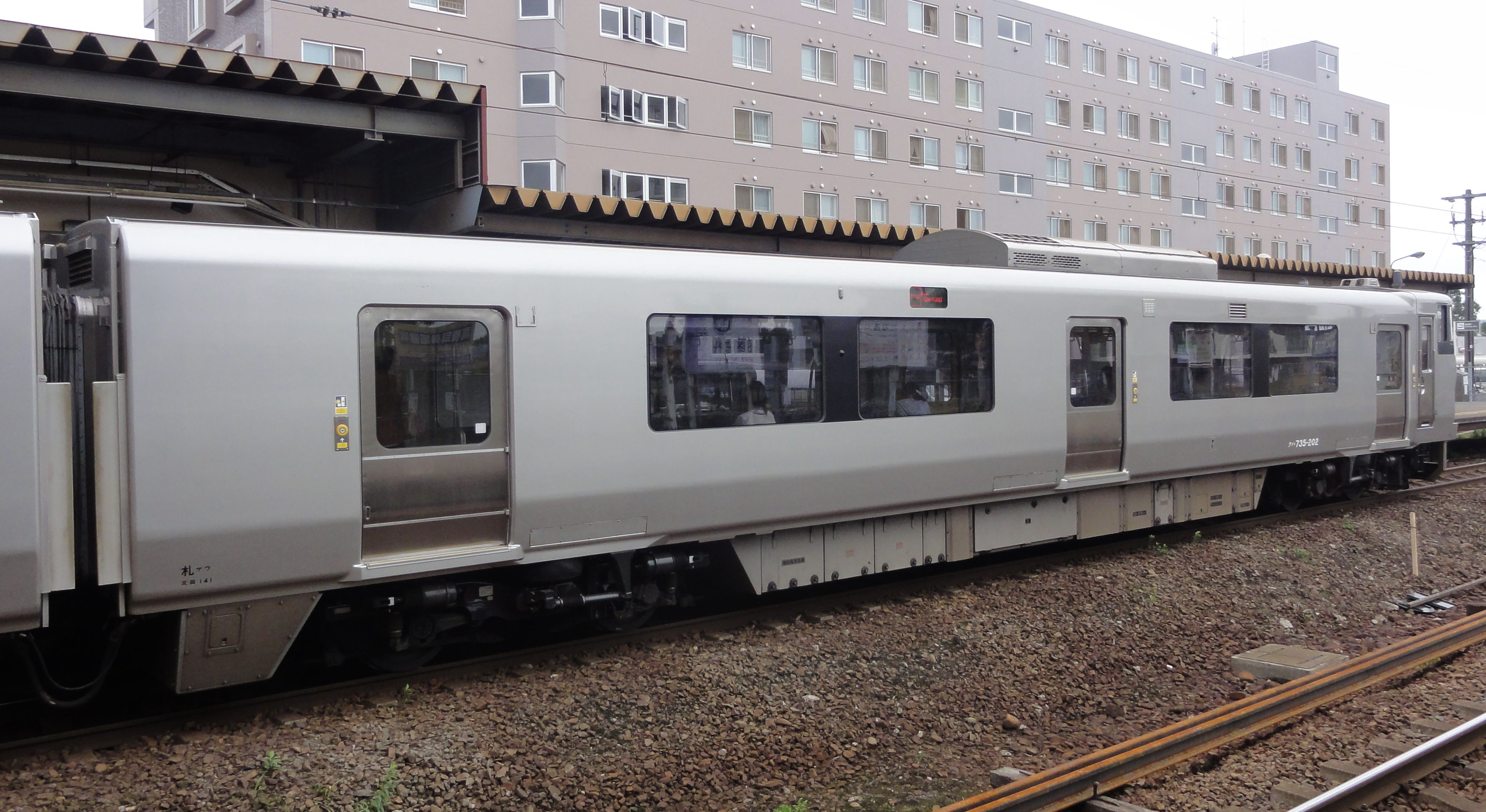
KuHa 735-202

== Interior ==
The 735 series design continues the basic configuration of the earlier 731 series with longitudinal seating throughout. The floor is 100 mm (3.9 in) lower than on previous trains, for improved accessibility. Car 1 has a universal access toilet.

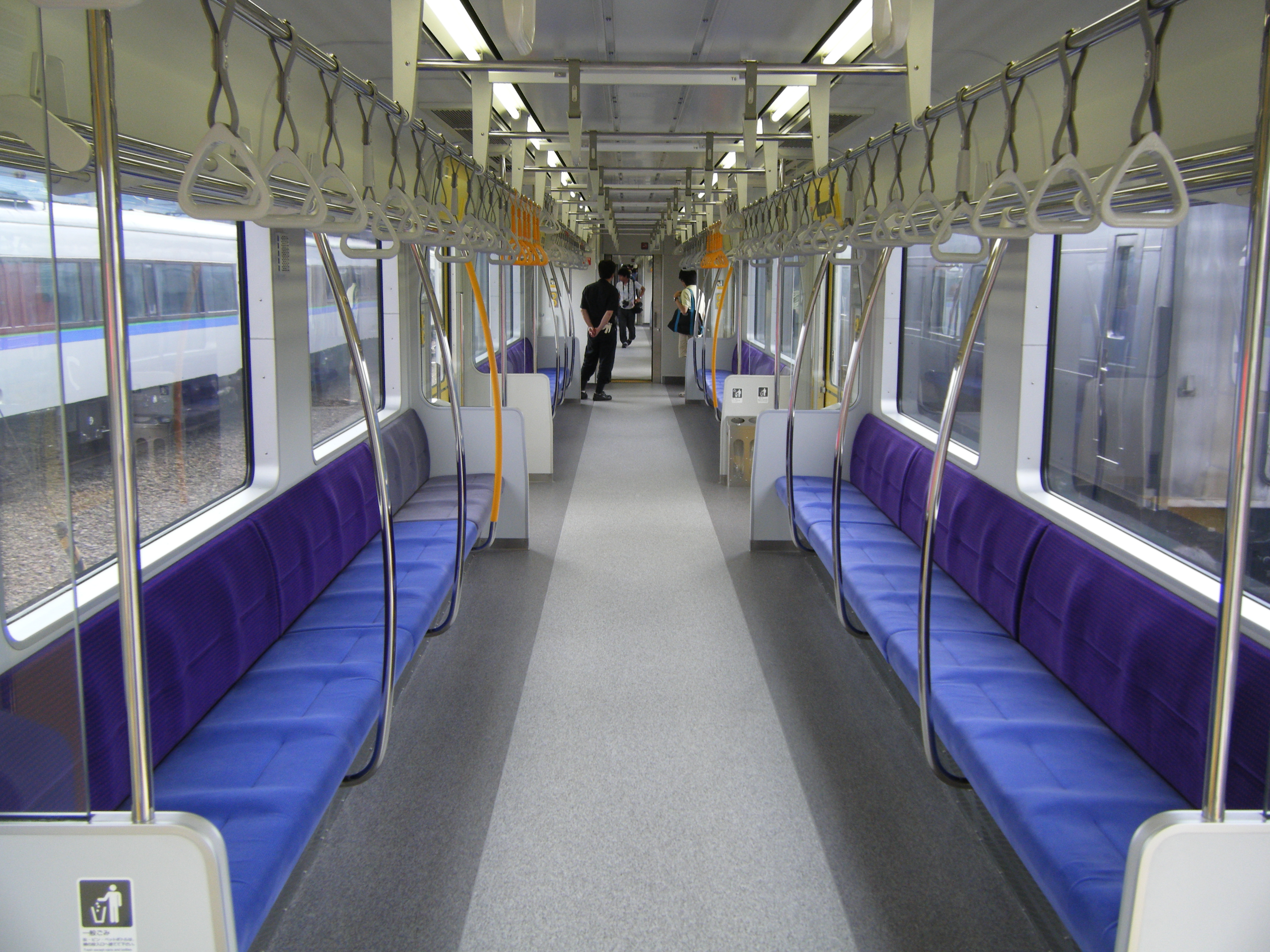
Interior view, August 2010

== History ==
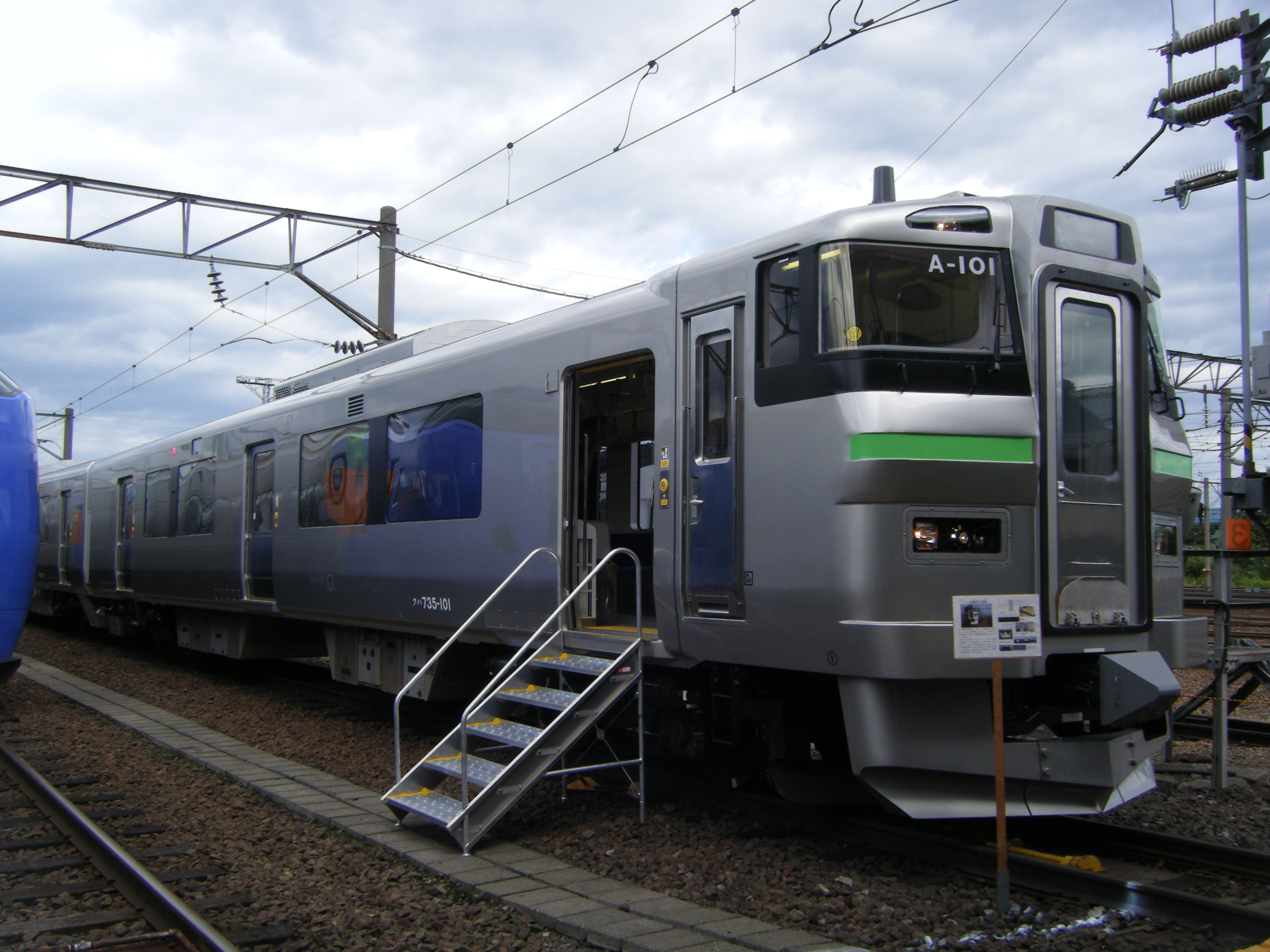
Set A-101 on display at Sapporo Depot Open Day, August 2010

Two 3-car sets were delivered from the Hitachi factory in Yamaguchi Prefecture in March 2010.

The sets first entered revenue-earning service on 1 May 2012.
