= 721 series =

Japanese train type

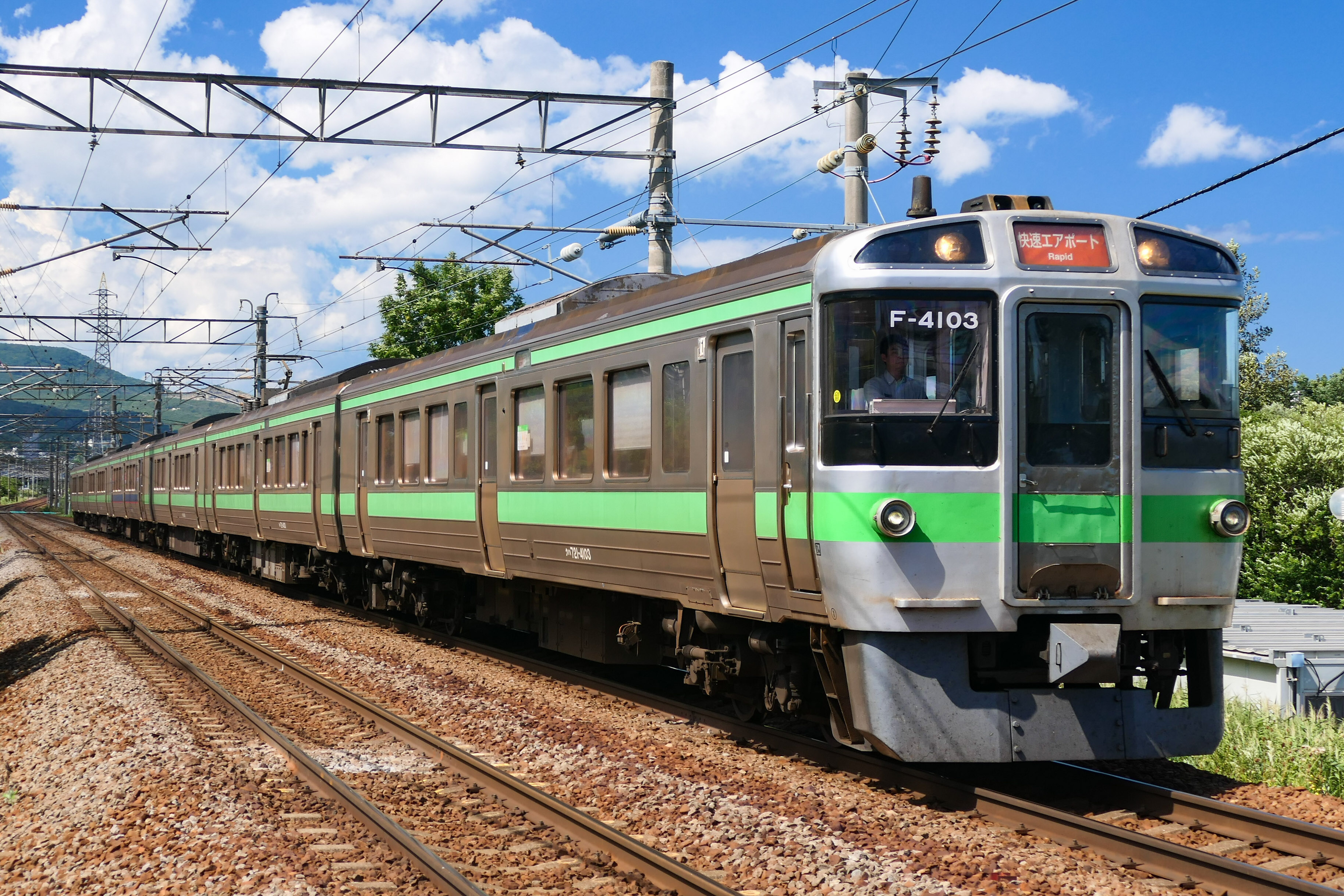
- Set F-4103, August 2024
- In service: 1988–Present
- Manufacturers: Hitachi, JR Hokkaido, Kawasaki Heavy Industries, Tokyu Car
- Constructed: 1988–2003
- Scrapped: 2023–
- Number built: 135 vehicles (34 sets)
- Number in service: 126 vehicles (31 sets)
- Formation: 3/6 cars per trainset
- Operator: JR Hokkaido
- Depot: Sapporo
- Lines served: Hakodate Main Line, Chitose Line

Specifications
- Car body construction: Stainless steel
- Car length: 21,670 mm (71 ft 1 in) (end cars); 21,300 mm (69 ft 11 in) (intermediate cars)
- Width: 2,954 mm (9 ft 8.3 in)
- Height: 4,090 mm (13 ft 5 in)
- Doors: 3 per side
- Maximum speed: 130 km/h (81 mph)
- Traction system: Thyristor drive (1st-5th batch); GTO–VVVF (6th-7th batch); IGBT–VVVF (8th batch)
- Electric system: 20 kV 50 Hz AC (overhead line)
- Safety system: ATS-DN
- Multiple working: 731 series, 733 series, 735 series
- Track gauge: 1,067 mm (3 ft 6 in)

The 721 series (721系) is an AC electric multiple unit (EMU) operated by Hokkaido Railway Company (JR Hokkaido) on Sapporo area suburban services in Hokkaido, Japan since 1988.

== Design ==
The trains were built jointly by Hitachi, JR Hokkaido (Naebo Factory), Kawasaki Heavy Industries, and Tokyu Car (Yokohama).

== Fleet ==
As of 1 April 2012, the fleet consists of 135 vehicles, formed as 23 3-car sets and 11 6-car sets.

== Variants ==
- 721-0 series
- 721-1000 series
- 721-2000 series
- 721-3000 series
- 721-4000 series
- 721-5000 series

== Withdrawal ==
Withdrawals of the 721 series commenced in 2023 with 721-3000 series set F-3016 being scrapped as of August. This continued the following year with sets F-4 and F-3015 being sent to Naebo for scrapping in April 2024.

In April 2024, JR Hokkaido announced that it will replace the 721 series with additional 733 series trains on Chitose Line Airport services.

On 18 September 2026, JR Hokkaido announced that it will withdraw the rest of the 721 series on the airport service route with the 739 series train by spring 2027.
