= 711 series =

Japanese train type

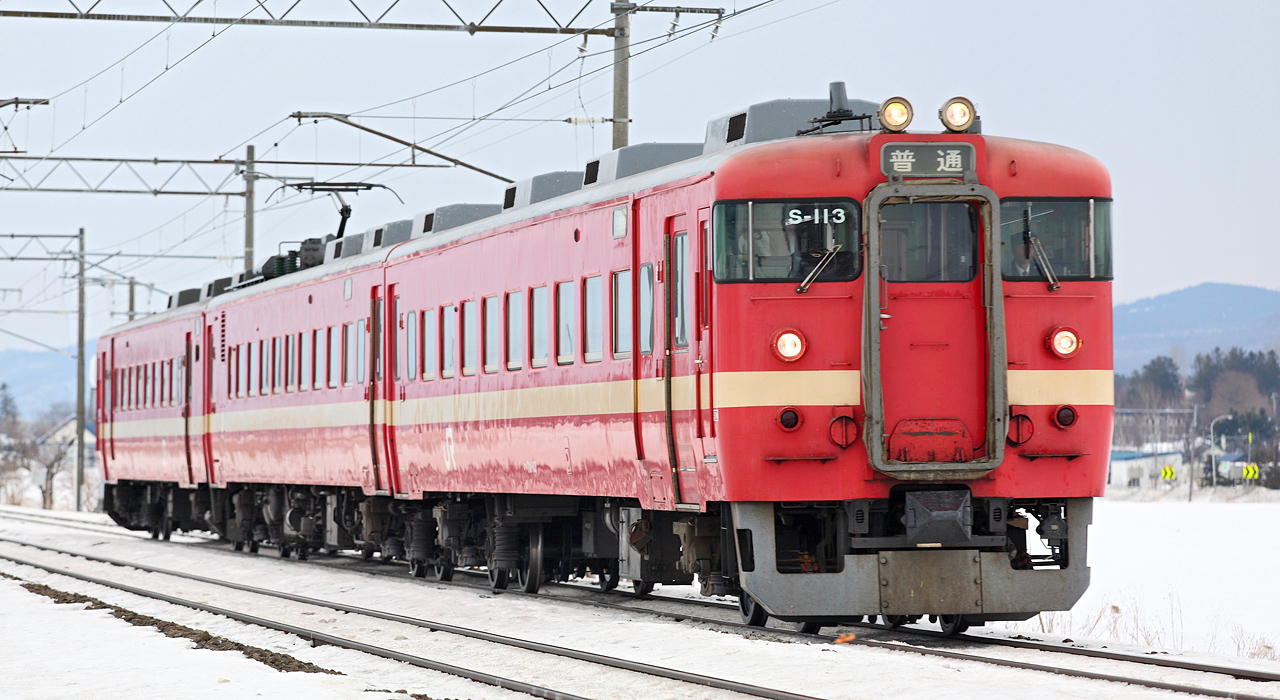
- 711 series set S-113 in service in January 2009
- In service: 1968 – March 2015
- Manufacturers: Hitachi; Kawasaki Heavy Industries; Kisha Seizo; Tokyu Car
- Constructed: 1967–1980
- Number built: 114 vehicles (38 sets)
- Number in service: None
- Number preserved: 3 vehicles
- Formation: 3 cars per trainset
- Operator: JR Hokkaido
- Depot: Sapporo
- Lines served: Hakodate Main Line, Chitose Line, Muroran Main Line

Specifications
- Car body construction: Steel
- Car length: 20,000 mm (65 ft 7 in)
- Width: 2,950 mm (9 ft 8 in)
- Doors: 2 per side
- Maximum speed: 110 km/h (68 mph)
- Traction system: Thyristor drive
- Traction motors: MT54A; MT54E
- Electric system: 20 kV AC (50 Hz)
- Current collection: Overhead line
- Bogies: DT38 (motored), TR208 (trailer)
- Safety systems: ATS-SN, ATS-DN
- Track gauge: 1,067 mm (3 ft 6 in)

The 711 series (711系, 711-kei) was an AC electric multiple unit (EMU) train type operated by Hokkaido Railway Company (JR Hokkaido) on Sapporo area suburban services in Hokkaido, Japan, from 1968 until March 2015. It was the first AC EMU train to be operated in Japan by the former Japanese National Railways (JNR). The last remaining trains in service were withdrawn on 13 March 2015.

== Fleet ==
By 1 October 2014, 36 vehicles (12 sets) were still in service, all based at Sapporo Depot.

== Formations ==
The 711 series trains were formed as three-car sets with one motored intermediate car and two non-powered driving trailer cars, as shown below.

Car No.	1	2	3
Designation	Tc'	M	Tc
Numbering	KuHa 711-200	MoHa 711-100	KuHa 711-100

Car 2 was fitted with one N-PS785 single-arm pantograph.

=== Former prototype sets S901/902 ===
The former prototype sets, S901 and S902 were formed as shown below.

Designation	Tc	Mc	Tc'
Numbering	KuHa 711-100	KuMoHa 711-900	KuHa 711-900

== Interior ==
Seating consisted of a mixture of transverse seating bays and longitudinal bench seating.

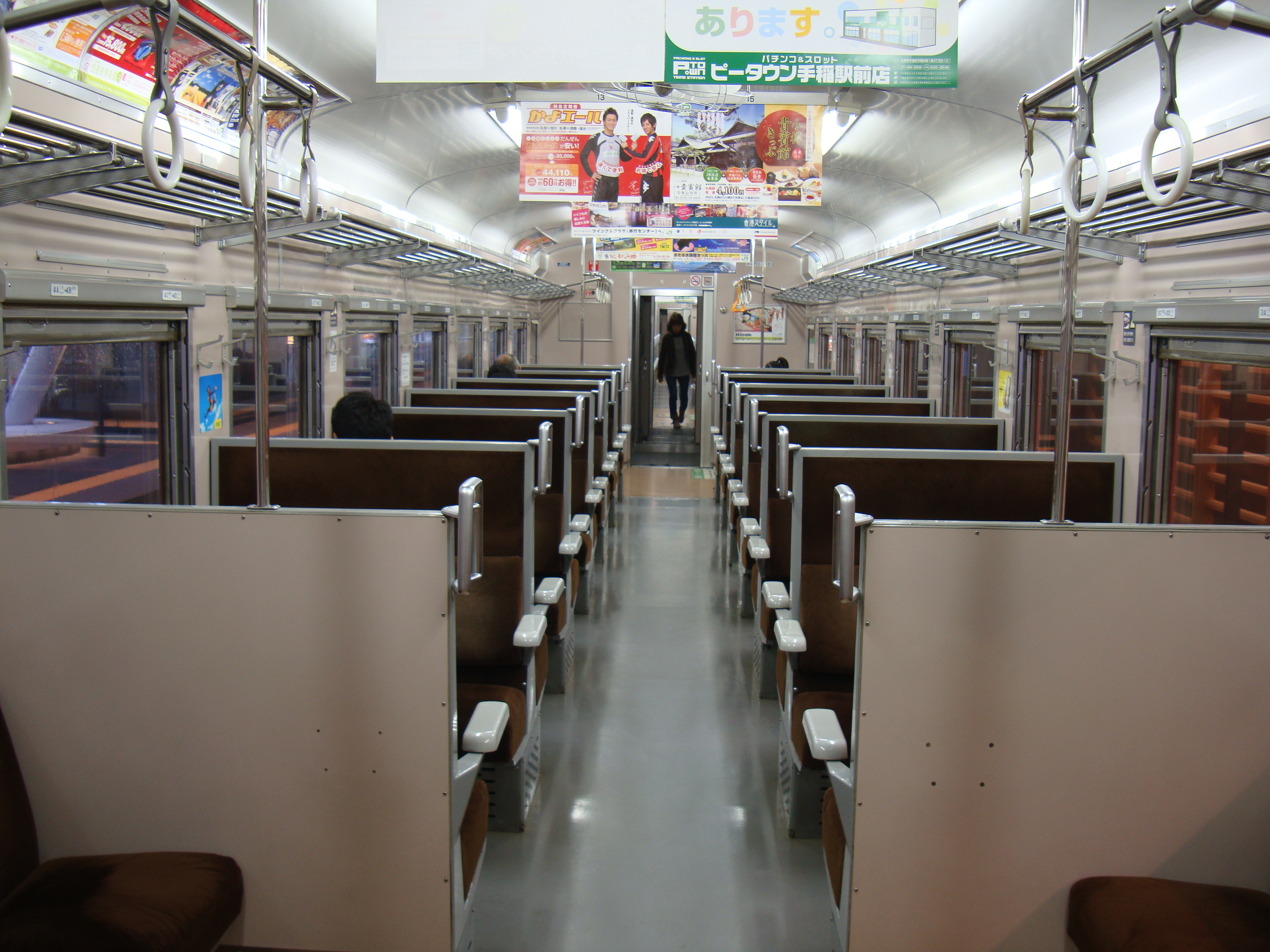
Interior of KuHa 711-210 (set S-110) in October 2011

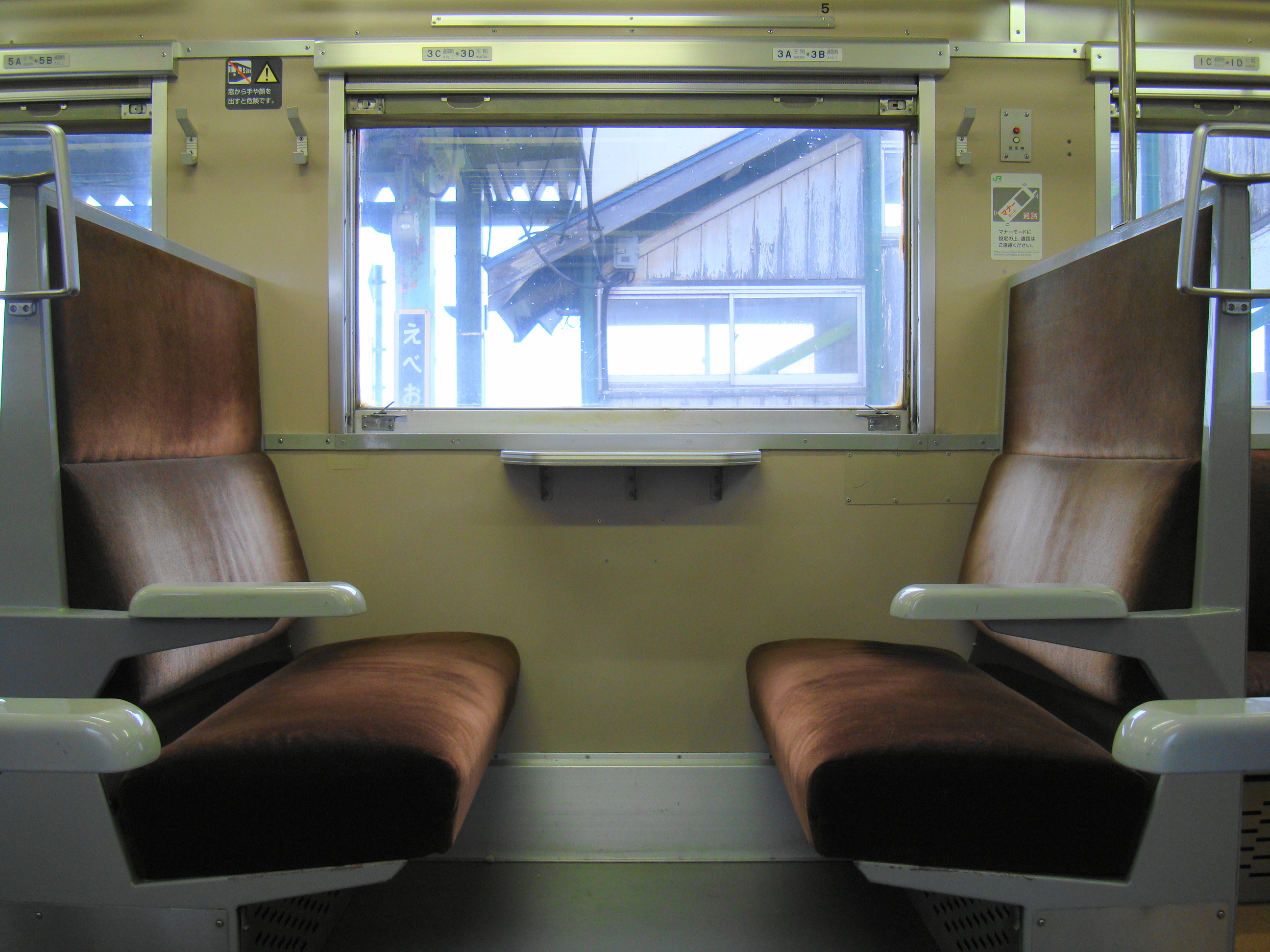
A four-person seating bay in KuHa 711-210 (set S-110) in October 2011

== History ==
=== Prototype sets ===
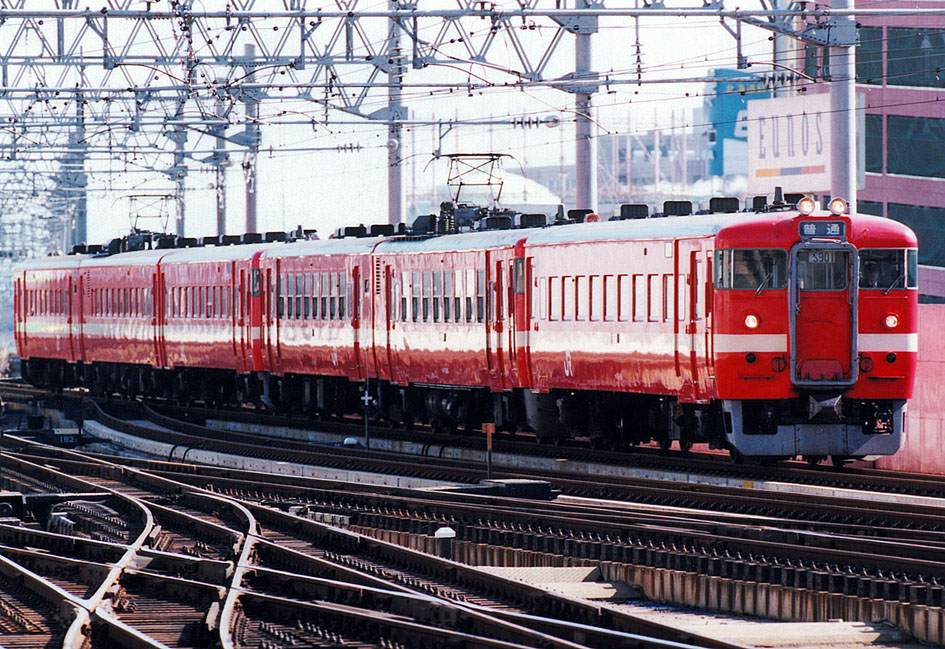
Former prototype set S901 leading a 6-car formation at Sapporo, 1994

Two prototype two-car sets, numbered KuMoHa 711-901 + KuHa 711-901 and KuMoHa 711-902 + KuHa 711-902, were delivered in February 1967 for test running ahead of the start of electric suburban services between Otaru and Takikawa from 1968. Both sets were based on the KiHa 22 diesel multiple unit design, but set 901 had opening two-pane windows and featured two sets of four-leaf folding doors per side, whereas set 902 had sealed double-glazed windows, as used on the subsequent full-production sets. The two sets were modified to full-production standards in 1968 and 1970, but set 901 retained its opening windows.

=== Full-production sets ===
The first full-production three-car sets were delivered from August 1968. A third, centre, door was added to some of the KuHa 711 cars from 1987. All cars became no-smoking from 1 July 1992. Priority seating was added from 1 October 1997. Air conditioning was added to the two-door sets between 2001 and 2002. The original scissors-type pantographs were replaced with N-PS785 single-arm pantographs between 2004 and 2005.

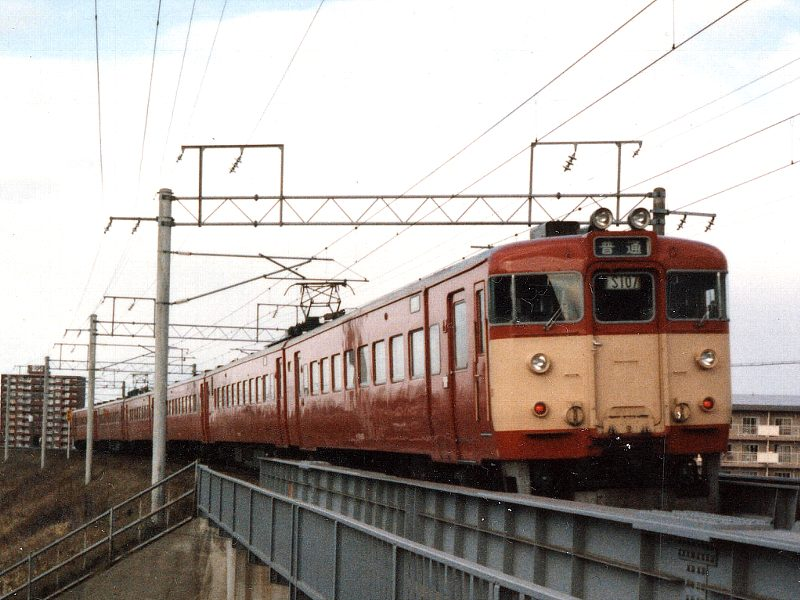
Set S107 in original livery in 1982

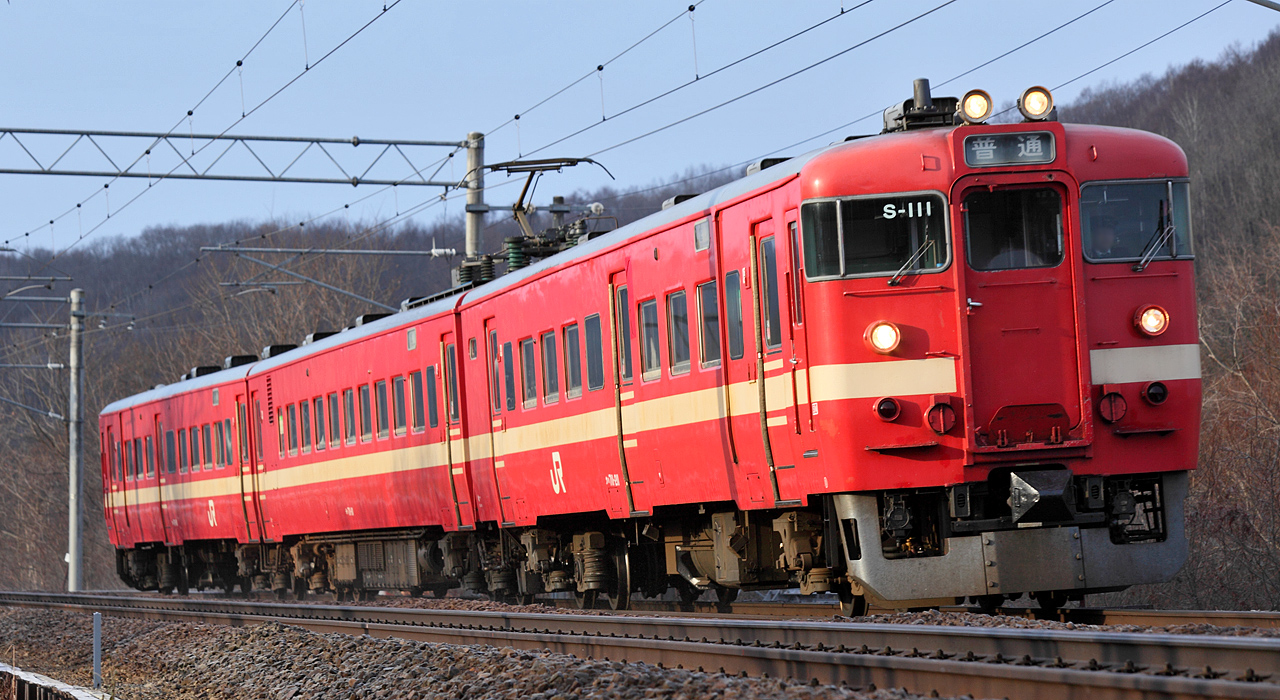
Set S-111 with three-door end cars, November 2009

=== Repainted sets ===
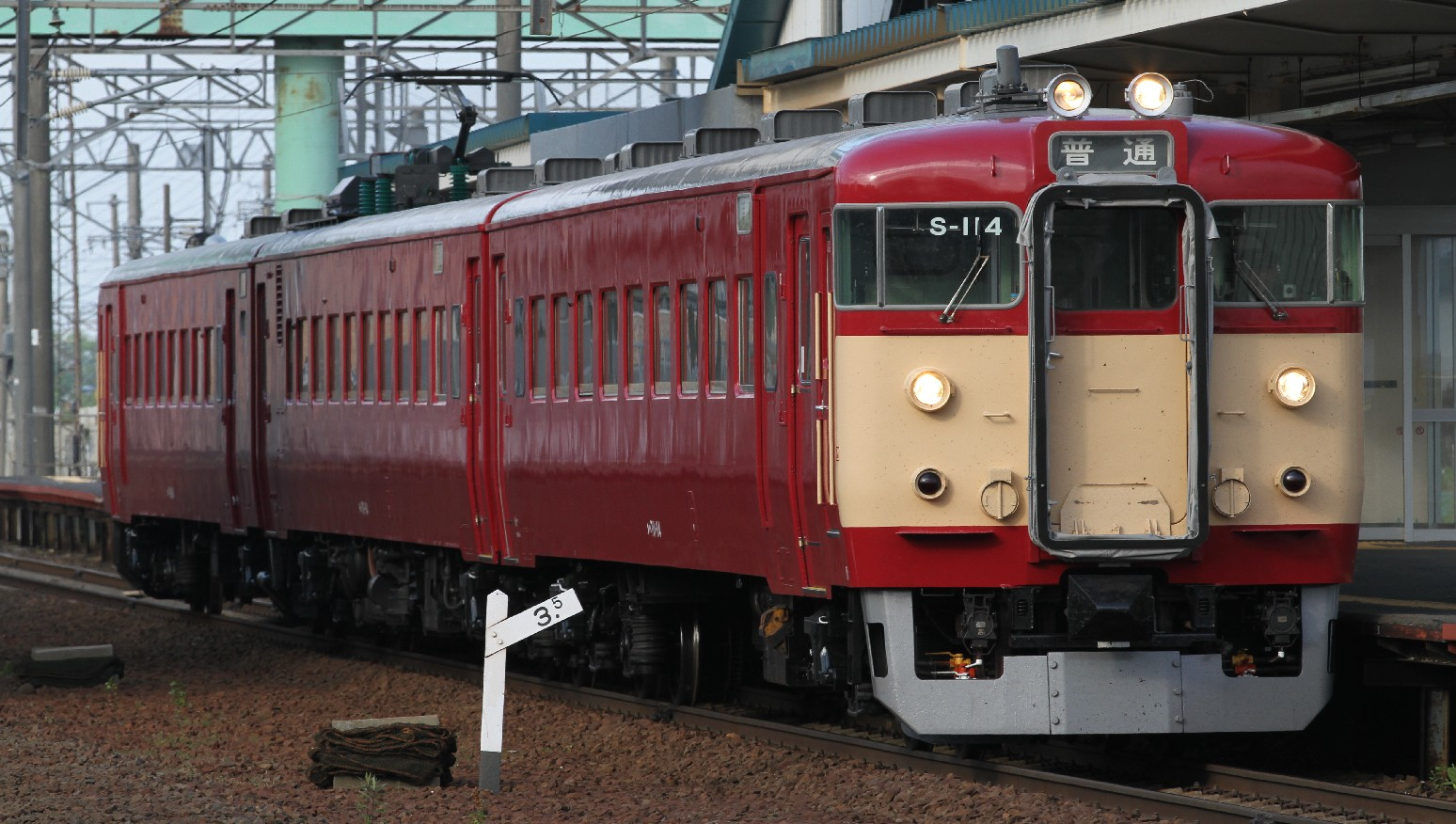
Repainted set S-114 in June 2012

In 2011, set S-110 was repainted into its original JNR all-over crimson livery, and this was followed in May 2012 by a second similarly repainted set, S-114.

=== Withdrawal ===
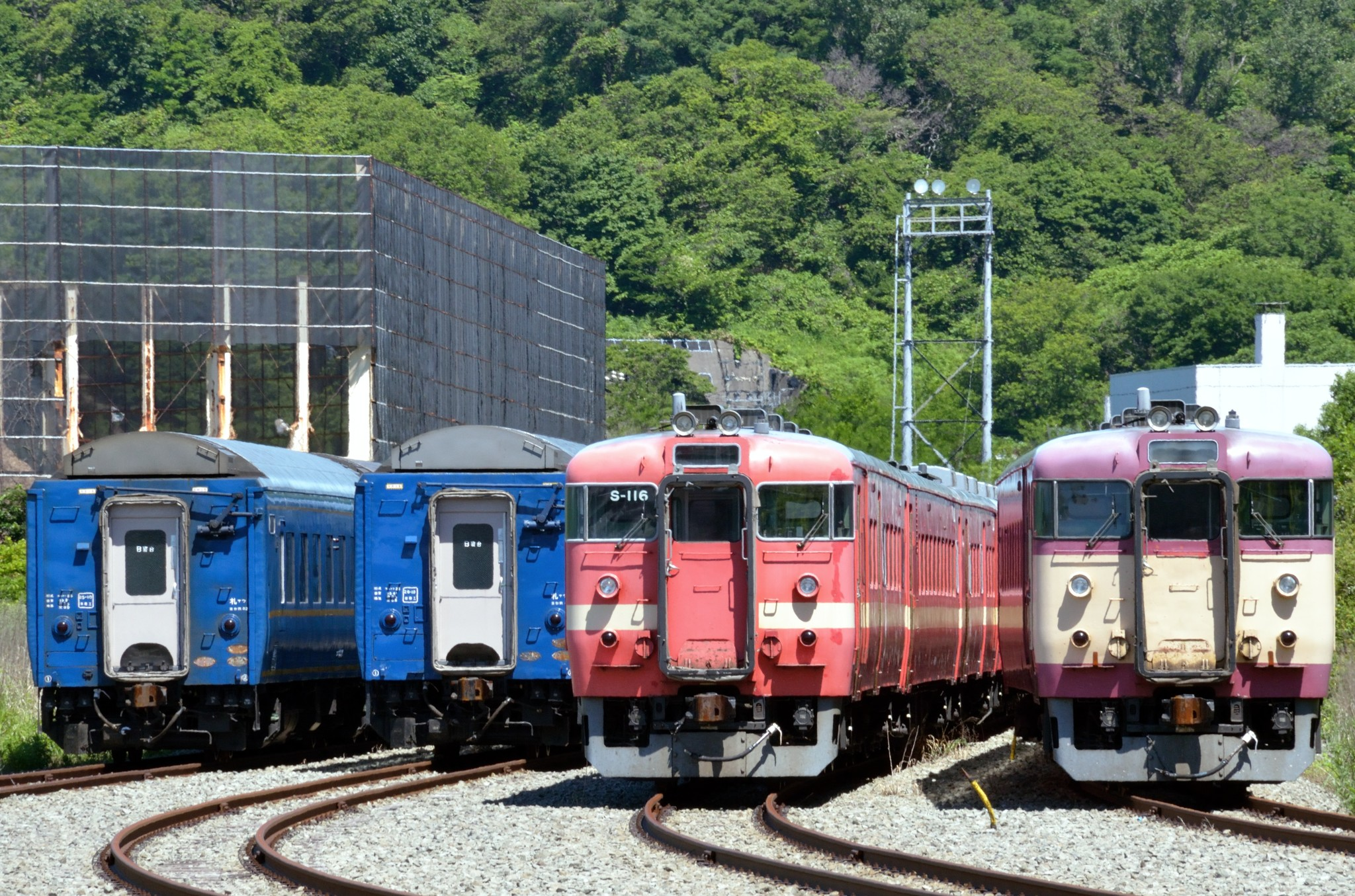
Withdrawn 711 series sets awaiting cutting up at Jinyamachi Rinkai Yard in Muroran, Hokkaido, in July 2015

The last remaining sets in service were withdrawn on 13 March 2015.

== Preserved examples ==
As of July 2017, three 711 series vehicles have been preserved, as follows.

- KuHa 711 29: Preserved in Chitose, Hokkaido, and used as the "Cafe Garden Station" restaurant
- KuHa 711 103 + KuHa 711 203: Preserved outside in Iwamizawa, Hokkaido
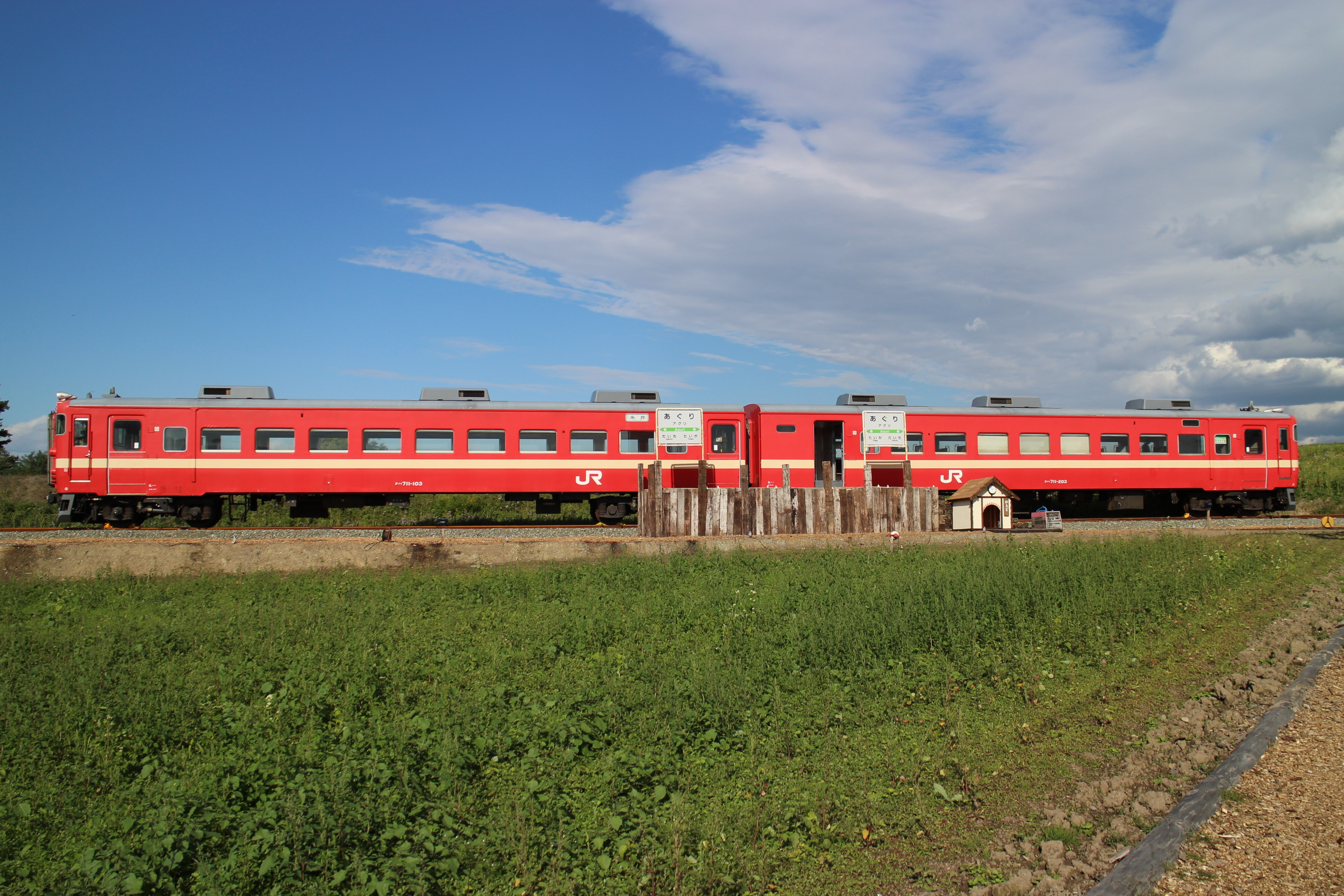
Preserved cars KuHa 711 103 + KuHa 711 203 in October 2015
