= KiHa 201 series =

Japanese train type

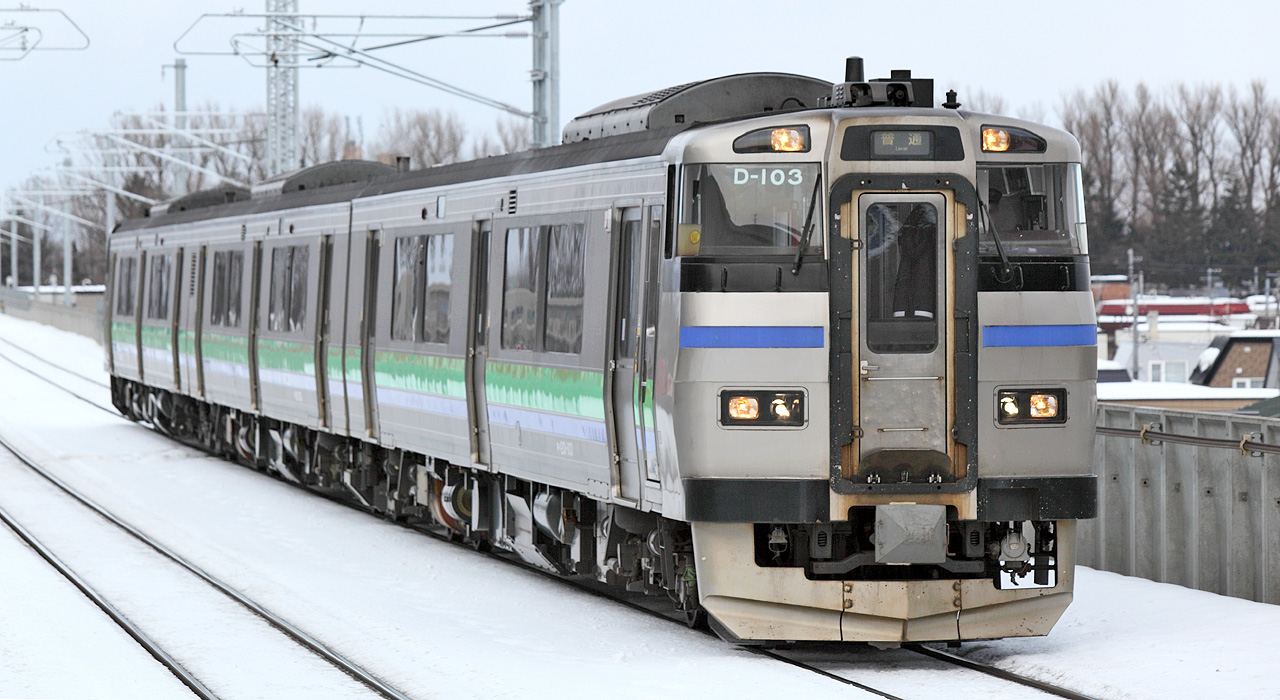
- KiHa 201 series in January 2010
- In service: 1997–Present
- Manufacturer: Fuji Heavy Industries
- Constructed: 1996–1997
- Number built: 12 vehicles (4 sets)
- Number in service: 12 vehicles (4 sets)
- Formation: 3 cars per trainset
- Fleet numbers: D-101–104
- Operator: JR Hokkaido
- Depot: Naebo
- Lines served: Hakodate Main Line, Sassho Line

Specifications
- Car body construction: Stainless steel
- Car length: 21,670 mm (71 ft 1 in) (end cars); 21,300 mm (69 ft 11 in) (intermediate cars)
- Width: 2,800 mm (9 ft 2 in)
- Height: 4,012 mm (13 ft 2 in)
- Doors: 3 per side
- Maximum speed: 130 km/h (81 mph)
- Prime mover: N-DMF13HZE (450 hp or 336 kW) × 2 per car
- Power output: 2,700 hp (2,013 kW) per 3-car set
- Transmission: Hydraulic
- Bogies: N-DT201
- Multiple working: 731 series EMU
- Track gauge: 1,067 mm (3 ft 6 in)

The KiHa 201 series (キハ201系) is a tilting diesel multiple unit (DMU) train type operated by Hokkaido Railway Company (JR Hokkaido) on Sapporo area suburban services in Hokkaido, Japan since 1997. The KiHa 201 trains are designed to work in multiple with 731 series electric multiple unit (EMU) sets with which it shares numerous features, including appearance, interior layout, bodyshell and control systems. These daily interworkings are the only diesel-electric multiple working in Japan. To allow them to work alongside faster and more powerful EMUs, KiHa 201 units are uniquely fitted with pneumatic tilting bogies designed by Kawasaki Heavy Industries and used on KiHa 261 series express trains.

The "KiHa" designation derives from the classification system used by JNR. "Ki" indicates a diesel-powered vehicle, while "Ha" indicates an ordinary passenger car, as opposed to a green car.

== Formation ==
The fleet is formed as four 3-car sets, D-101–104, as follows.

Designation	Mc1	M	Mc2
Numbering	KiHa 201-100	KiHa 201-200	KiHa 201-300
Weight (t)	40.0	38.0	40.0
Capacity Total/seated	141/50	153/52	141/50

== Interior ==
Seating consists of longitudinal bench seating throughout. The KiHa 201-200 cars are fitted with a toilet. For greater capacity and shorter loading times, features typical to trains in Hokkaido, such as entrance vestibules designed to keep passenger compartments warm, are for the first time replaced by individually-opening semi-automatic doors and infrared heating.

== History ==
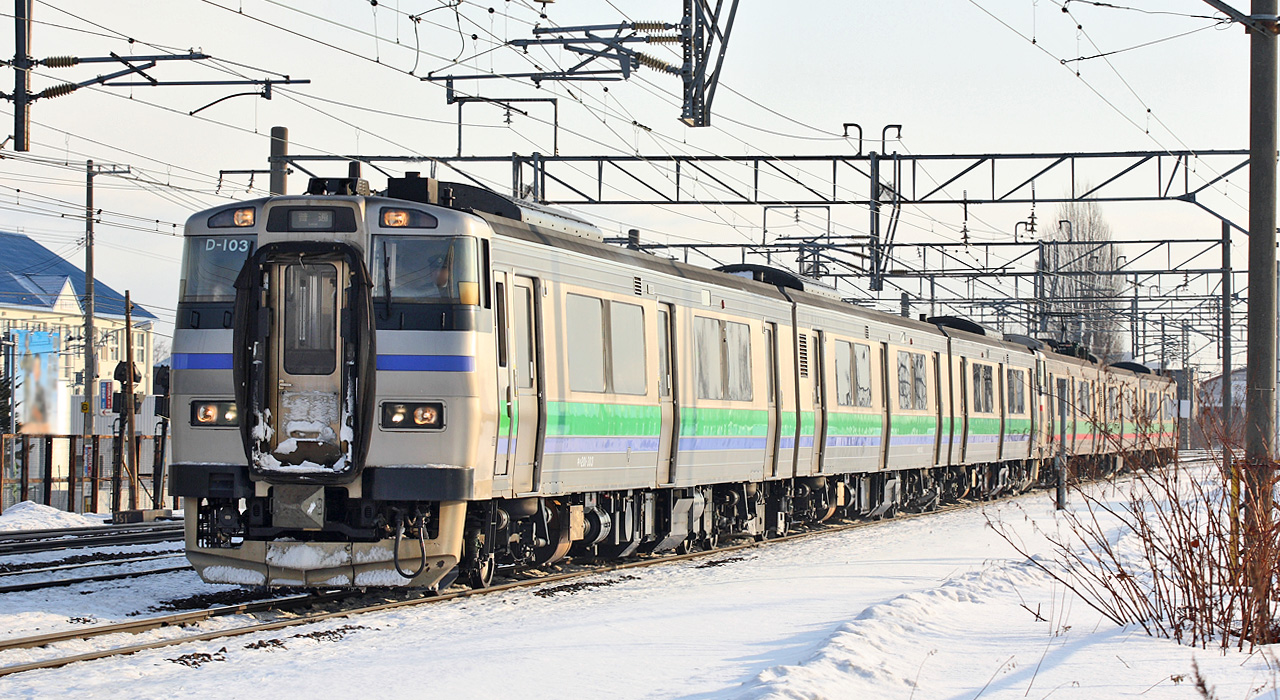
KiHa 201 series DMU running in multiple with a 731 series EMU in January 2009

The first set was delivered from Fuji Heavy Industries to Naebo Depot in December 1996, and the fleet of four sets entered revenue service from the start of 22 March 1997 timetable revision.

Polycarbonate window covers were fitted to the fleet between June and September 2002.

== Services ==
Operating on the Hakodate Main Line between Rankoshi, Sapporo and Ebetsu, these commuter units are used on local and Ishikari Liner and Niseko Liner Rapid services, formerly operating on the Sassho Line before its electrification in 2012, as well as the Chitose Line. Multiple workings with 731 series EMUs are currently limited to one single trip a day.

Unlike other DMUs operated by JR Hokkaido, KiHa 201s are not equipped for driver only operation. Services on lines – such as on the Sassho Line pre-electrification – where most trains operate with the driver only still require conductors when KiHa 201s are used.
