= Shin-Kotoni Station =

Railway station in Sapporo, Japan

Coordinates: 43.1130°N 141.3352°E

Shin-Kotoni Station 新琴似駅
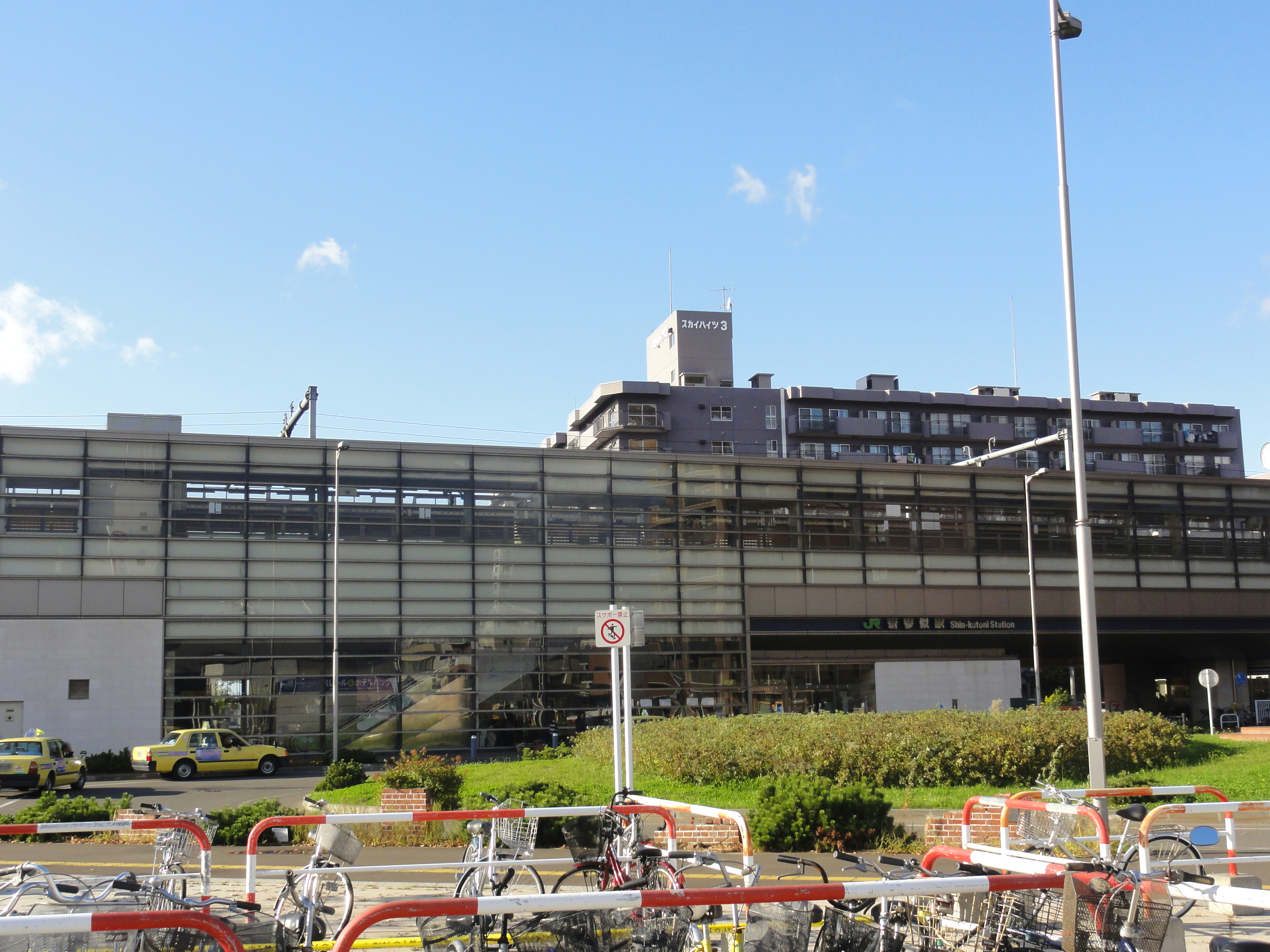

General information
- Location: Kita-ku, Sapporo, Hokkaido; Japan
- Operator: JR Hokkaido
- Line: Sasshō Line
- Distance: 5.6 km (3.5 mi) from Sōen
- Connections: Asabu Subway Station

Construction
- Accessible: Yes

Other information
- Status: Staffed
- Station code: G05

History
- Opened: 20 November 1934; 91 years ago

Passengers
- FY2014: 3,738 daily

Services
Preceding station	JR Hokkaido	Following station
Shinkawa towards Sapporo	Sasshō Line	Taihei towards Hokkaidō-Iryōdaigaku
Location

Shin-Kotoni Station (新琴似駅, Shin-Kotoni-eki) is a railway station on the Sasshō Line in Kita-ku, Sapporo, Hokkaido, Japan, operated by the Hokkaido Railway Company (JR Hokkaido). The station is numbered G05.

While situated relatively close to Asabu Station on the Namboku Line of the Sapporo Municipal Subway, there are no transfer passageways between these two stations.

== Lines ==
Shin-Kotoni Station is served by the Sasshō Line (Gakuen Toshi Line) from Sapporo to Hokkaidō-Iryōdaigaku.

== Station layout ==
The elevated station has two side platforms serving two tracks. The station has automated ticket machines, automated turnstiles which accept Kitaca, and a "Midori no Madoguchi" staffed ticket office.

=== Platforms ===
1	■ Sasshō Line	for Sōen and Sapporo
2	■ Sasshō Line	for Ainosato-Kyōikudai and Hokkaidō-Iryōdaigaku

== History ==
The station opened on 20 November 1934.

Electric services commenced from 1 June 2012, following electrification of the line between Sapporo and Hokkaidō-Iryōdaigaku.
