= Takuhoku Station =

Railway station in Sapporo, Japan

Coordinates: 43.1554°N 141.3809°E

Takuhoku Station 拓北駅
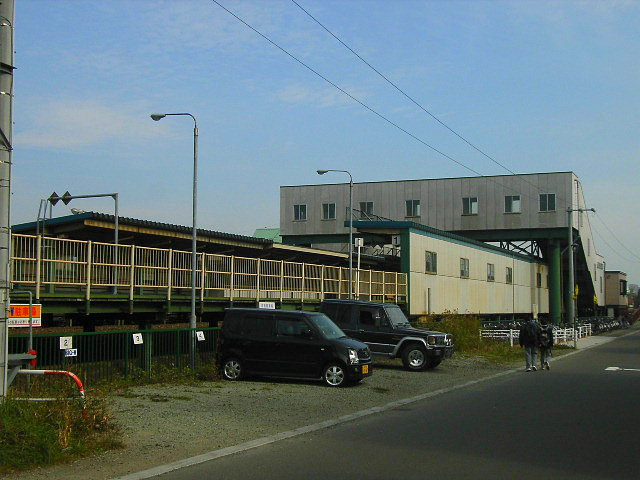
- Takuhoku Station, October 2004

General information
- Location: Kita-ku, Sapporo, Hokkaido; Japan
- Operator: JR Hokkaido
- Line: Sasshō Line
- Distance: 12.2 km (7.6 mi) from Sōen
- Platforms: 2 side platforms
- Tracks: 2

Construction
- Structure type: At grade

Other information
- Status: Staffed
- Station code: G09

History
- Opened: 15 December 1967; 58 years ago

Passengers
- FY2014: 2,418 daily

Services
Preceding station	JR Hokkaido	Following station
Shinoro towards Sapporo	Sasshō Line	Ainosato-Kyōikudai towards Hokkaidō-Iryōdaigaku
Location

Takuhoku Station (拓北駅, Takuhoku-eki) is a railway station on the Sasshō Line in Kita-ku, Sapporo, Hokkaido, Japan, operated by the Hokkaido Railway Company (JR Hokkaido). The station is numbered G09.

== Lines ==
Takuhoku Station is served by the Sasshō Line (Gakuen Toshi Line) from Sapporo to Hokkaidō-Iryōdaigaku.

== Station layout ==
The station has two side platforms serving two tracks. The station has automated ticket machines and Kitaca card readers. and a "Midori no Madoguchi" staffed ticket office.

=== Platforms ===
1	■ Sasshō Line	for Sōen and Sapporo
2	■ Sasshō Line	for Ishikari-Tōbetsu and Hokkaidō-Iryōdaigaku

== History ==
The station opened on 15 December 1967.

Electric services commenced from 1 June 2012, following electrification of the line between Sapporo and Hokkaidō-Iryōdaigaku.
