= Shinkawa Station (Hokkaido) =

Railway station in Sapporo, Japan

Coordinates: 43.0982°N 141.3234°E

Shinkawa Station 新川駅
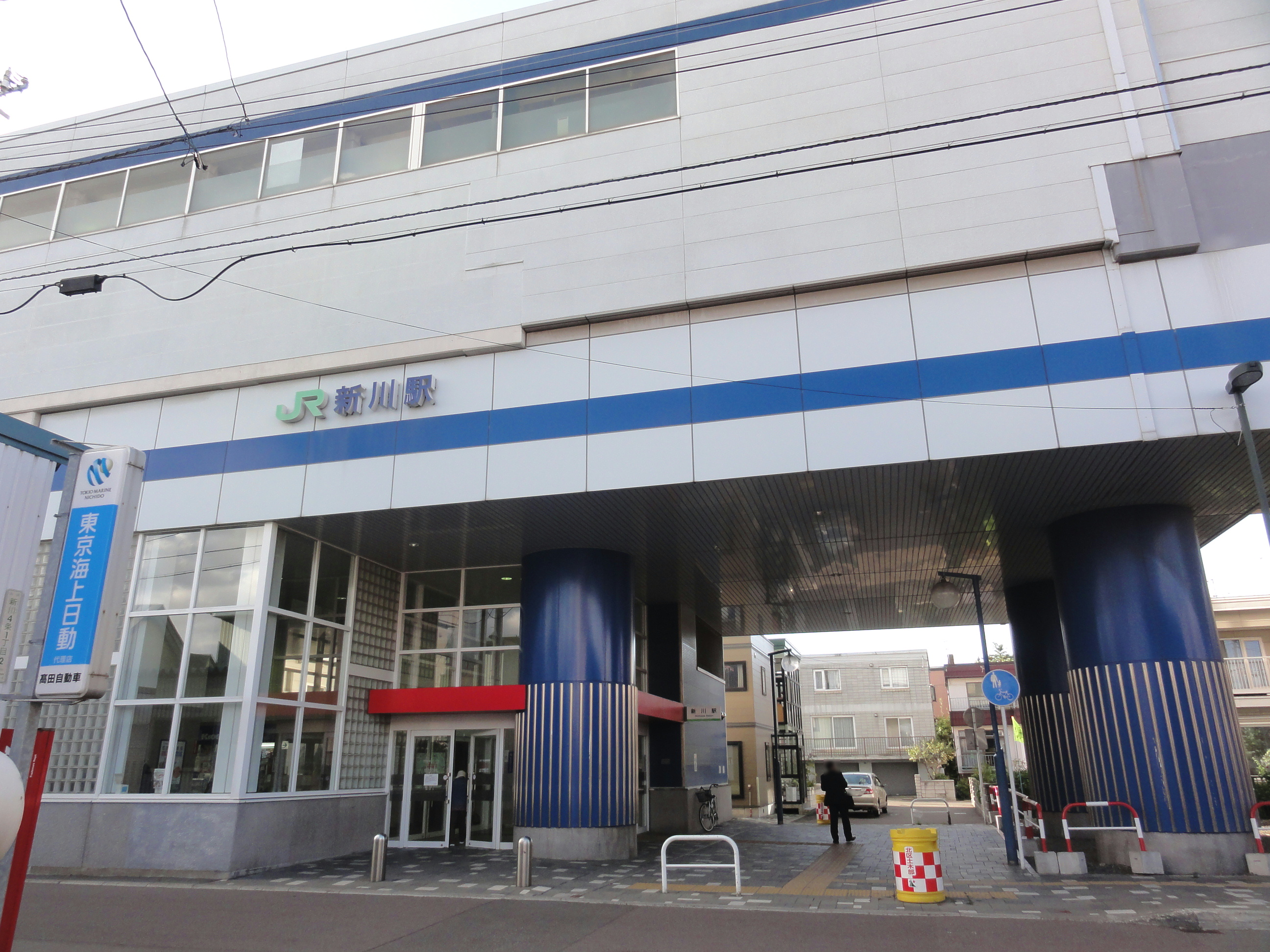

General information
- Location: Kita-ku, Sapporo, Hokkaido; Japan
- Operator: JR Hokkaido
- Line: Sasshō Line
- Distance: 3.7 km (2.3 mi) from Sōen
- Platforms: 2 side platforms
- Tracks: 2

Construction
- Structure type: Elevated

Other information
- Status: Staffed
- Station code: G04

History
- Opened: 1 November 1986; 39 years ago

Passengers
- FY2014: 3,114 daily

Services
Preceding station	JR Hokkaido	Following station
Hachiken towards Sapporo	Sasshō Line	Shin-Kotoni towards Hokkaidō-Iryōdaigaku
Location
- Location within Japan

Shinkawa Station (新川駅, Shinkawa-eki) is a railway station on the Sasshō Line in Kita-ku, Sapporo, Hokkaido, Japan, operated by the Hokkaido Railway Company (JR Hokkaido). The station is numbered G04.

== Lines ==
Shinkawa Station is served by the Sasshō Line (Gakuen Toshi Line) from Sapporo to Hokkaidō-Iryōdaigaku.

== Station layout ==
The elevated station has two side platforms serving two tracks. The station has automated ticket machines, automated turnstiles which accept Kitaca, and a "Midori no Madoguchi" staffed ticket office.

=== Platforms ===
1	■ Sasshō Line	for Sōen and Sapporo
2	■ Sasshō Line	for Ainosato-Kyōikudai and Hokkaidō-Iryōdaigaku

== History ==
The station opened on 1 November 1986.

Electric services commenced from 1 June 2012, following electrification of the line between Sapporo and Hokkaidō-Iryōdaigaku.
