= Ainosato-kōen Station =

Railway station in Sapporo, Japan

Ainosato-kōen Station あいの里公園駅
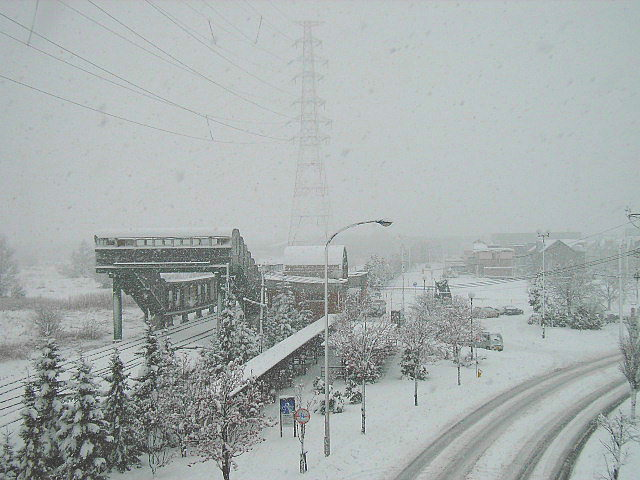
- Ainosato-kōen Station in December 2004

General information
- Location: Kita-ku, Sapporo, Hokkaido; Japan
- Coordinates: 43°09′41″N 141°24′49″E
- Operator: JR Hokkaido
- Line: Sasshō Line
- Distance: 15.1 km (9.4 mi) from Sōen
- Platforms: 2 side platforms
- Tracks: 2

Construction
- Structure type: At grade

Other information
- Status: Unstaffed
- Station code: G11

History
- Opened: 1 July 1958; 68 years ago

Passengers
- FY2014: 1,718 daily

Services
| Preceding station | JR Hokkaido | Following station |
|---|---|---|
| Ainosato-Kyōikudai towards Sapporo | Sasshō Line | ROYCE' Town towards Hokkaidō-Iryōdaigaku |
Location
- Location within Hokkaido Location within Japan

Ainosato-kōen Station (あいの里公園駅, Ainosato-kōen-eki) is a railway station on the Sasshō Line in Kita-ku, Sapporo, Hokkaido, Japan, operated by the Hokkaido Railway Company (JR Hokkaido). The station is numbered G11.

== Lines ==
Ainosato-kōen Station is served by the Sasshō Line (Gakuen Toshi Line) from Sapporo to Hokkaidō-Iryōdaigaku.

== Station layout ==
The station has two side platforms serving two tracks on the otherwise single-track section of the line east of Ainosato-Kyōikudai Station. The station has automated ticket machines and Kitaca card readers. The station is unattended.

== History ==
Electric services commenced from 1 June 2012, following electrification of the line between Sapporo and Hokkaidō-Iryōdaigaku.

== See also ==
- List of railway stations in Japan
