= Taihei Station =

Railway station in Sapporo, Japan

Coordinates: 43.1237°N 141.3488°E

Taihei Station 太平駅
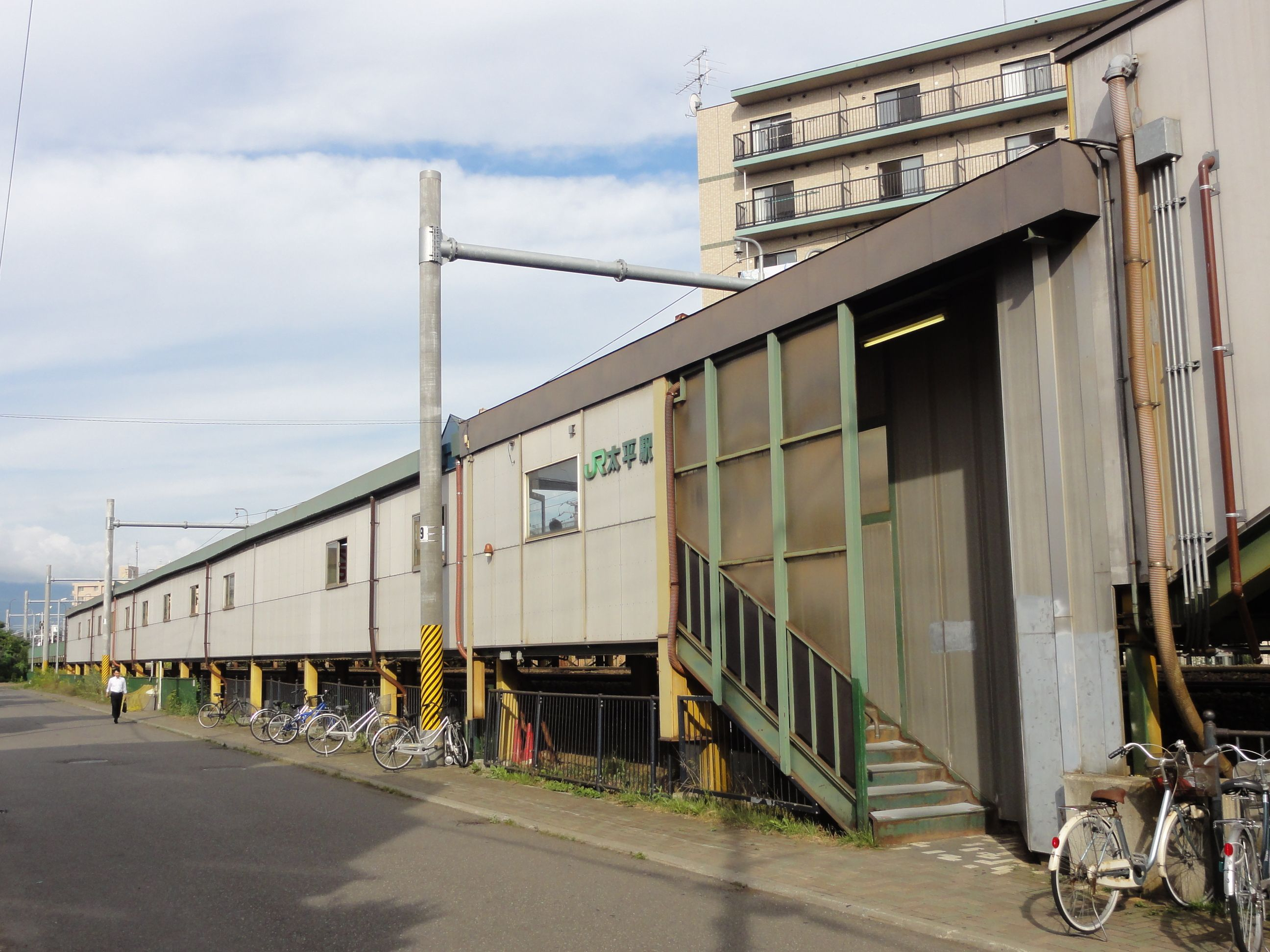
- Taihei Station entrance, August 2011

General information
- Location: Kita-ku, Sapporo, Hokkaido; Japan
- Operator: JR Hokkaido
- Line: Sasshō Line
- Distance: 7.3 km (4.5 mi) from Sōen
- Platforms: 2 side platforms
- Tracks: 2

Construction
- Structure type: At grade

Other information
- Status: Unstaffed
- Station code: G06

History
- Opened: 1 November 1986; 39 years ago

Passengers
- FY2014: 794 daily

Services
Preceding station	JR Hokkaido	Following station
Shin-Kotoni towards Sapporo	Sasshō Line	Yurigahara towards Hokkaidō-Iryōdaigaku
Location

Taihei Station (太平駅, Taihei-eki) is a railway station on the Sasshō Line in Kita-ku, Sapporo, Hokkaido, Japan, operated by the Hokkaido Railway Company (JR Hokkaido). The station is numbered G06.

== Lines ==
Taihei Station is served by the Sasshō Line (Gakuen Toshi Line) from Sapporo to Hokkaidō-Iryōdaigaku.

== Station layout ==
The station has two side platforms serving two tracks, connected by a passenger footbridge. The station has automated ticket machines and Kitaca card readers. The station is unattended.

== History ==
Electric services commenced from 1 June 2012, following electrification of the line between Sapporo and Hokkaidō-Iryōdaigaku.
