= Shinoro Station =

Railway station in Sapporo, Japan

Coordinates: 43.1455°N 141.3642°E

Shinoro Station 篠路駅
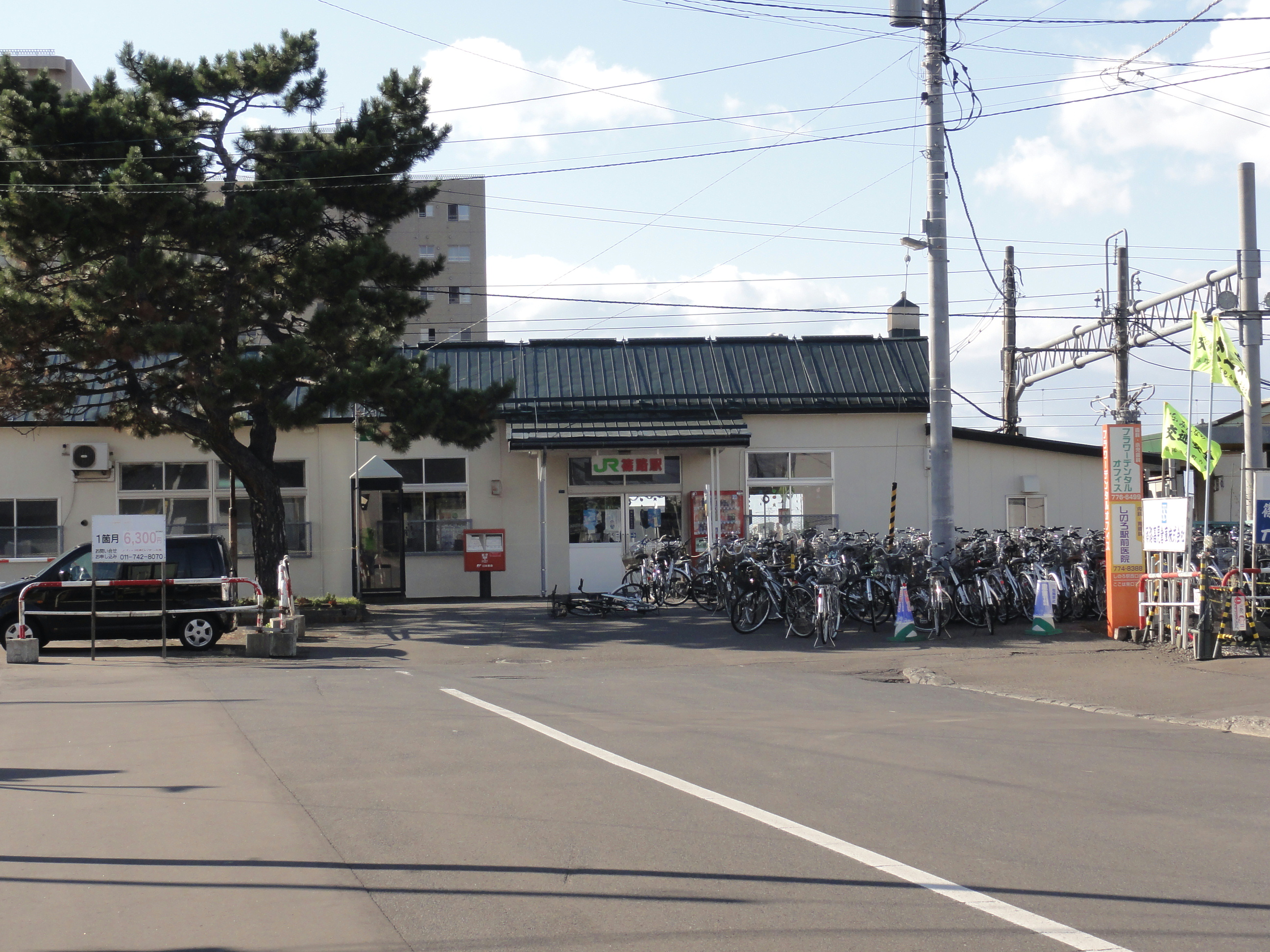

General information
- Location: Kita-ku, Sapporo, Hokkaido; Japan
- Operator: JR Hokkaido
- Line: Sasshō Line
- Distance: 10.2 km (6.3 mi) from Sōen
- Platforms: 2 side platforms
- Tracks: 2

Construction
- Structure type: At grade

Other information
- Status: Staffed
- Station code: G08

History
- Opened: 20 November 1934; 91 years ago

Passengers
- FY2014: 2,926 daily

Services
Preceding station	JR Hokkaido	Following station
Yurigahara towards Sapporo	Sasshō Line	Takuhoku towards Hokkaidō-Iryōdaigaku
Location
- Location within Hokkaido Location within Japan

Shinoro Station (篠路駅, Shinoro-eki) is a railway station on the Sasshō Line in Kita-ku, Sapporo, Hokkaido, Japan, operated by the Hokkaido Railway Company (JR Hokkaido). The station is numbered G08.

== Lines ==
Shinoro Station is served by the Sasshō Line (Gakuen Toshi Line) from Sapporo to Hokkaidō-Iryōdaigaku.

== Station layout ==
The station has two side platforms serving two tracks, connected by a passenger footbridge. The station has automated ticket machines and Kitaca card readers. and a "Midori no Madoguchi" staffed ticket office.

== History ==
Electric services commenced from 1 June 2012, following electrification of the line between Sapporo and Hokkaidō-Iryōdaigaku.

== See also ==
- List of railway stations in Japan
