= Hachiken Station =

Railway station in Sapporo, Japan

Coordinates: 43.0866°N 141.3187°E

Hachiken Station 八軒駅
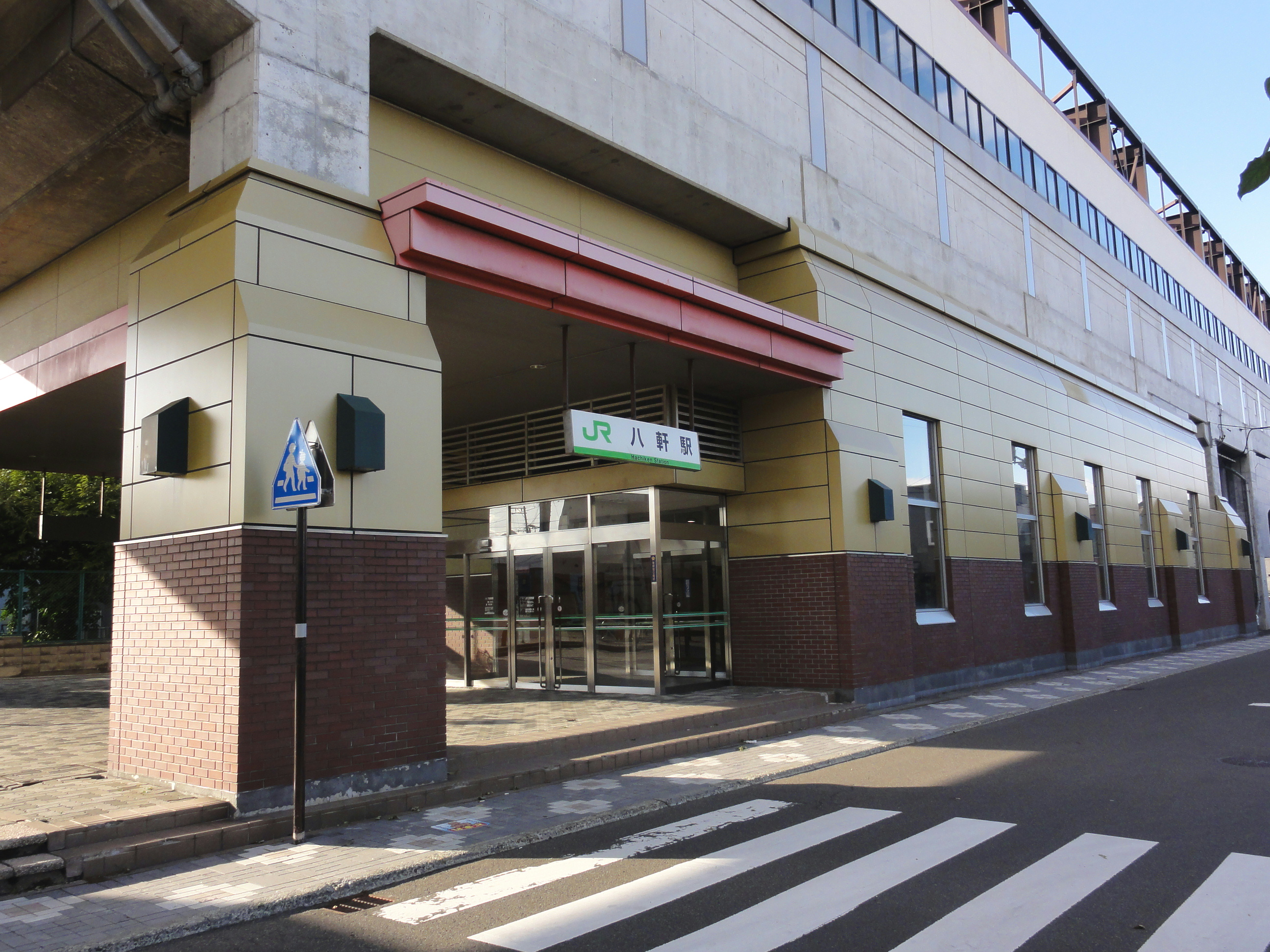

General information
- Location: Nishi-ku, Sapporo, Sapporo, Hokkaido; Japan
- Operator: JR Hokkaido
- Line: Sasshō Line
- Distance: 2.2 km (1.4 mi) from Sōen
- Platforms: 2 side platforms
- Tracks: 2

Construction
- Structure type: Elevated

Other information
- Status: Staffed
- Station code: G03

History
- Opened: 3 November 1988; 37 years ago

Passengers
- FY2014: 2,335 daily

Services
Preceding station	JR Hokkaido	Following station
Sōen towards Sapporo	Sasshō Line	Shinkawa towards Hokkaidō-Iryōdaigaku
Location

Hachiken Station (八軒駅, Hachiken-eki) is a railway station on the Sasshō Line in Nishi-ku, Sapporo, Hokkaido, Japan, operated by the Hokkaido Railway Company (JR Hokkaido). The station is numbered G03.

== Lines ==
Hachiken Station is served by the Sasshō Line (Gakuen Toshi Line) from Sapporo to Hokkaidō-Iryōdaigaku.

== Station layout ==
The elevated station has two side platforms serving two tracks. The station has automated ticket machines, automated turnstiles which accept Kitaca, and a "Midori no Madoguchi" staffed ticket office.

=== Platforms ===
1	■ Sasshō Line	for Ainosato-Kyōikudai and Hokkaidō-Iryōdaigaku
2	■ Sasshō Line	for Sōen and Sapporo

== History ==
The station opened on 3 November 1988.

Electric services commenced from 1 June 2012, following electrification of the line between Sapporo and Hokkaidō-Iryōdaigaku.
