= Shinkawa Station =

Shinkawa Station (新川駅) is the name of two train stations in Japan:

- Shinkawa Station (Ehime)
- Shinkawa Station (Hokkaido)
