= Kita-ku, Sapporo =

Kita 北区
- Ward
- Kita Ward
- Flag Seal

- Location of Kita-ku in Sapporo
- Coordinates: 43°5′27″N 141°20′27″E
- Country: Japan
- Prefecture: Hokkaidō
- City: Sapporo
- Established: April 1, 1972

Area
  - Total: 63.57 km^{2} (24.54 sq mi)

Population (2021)
  - Total: 285,936
  - Density: 4,498/km^{2} (11,650/sq mi)
- Estimation as of August 31, 2021
- Time zone: UTC+9 (Japan Standard Time)
- Postal: 001-8612
- Address: 6-1-1 Kita Nijuyonjyo, Kita-ku, Sapporo-shi, Hokkaido
- Telephone: +81 11-757-2400
- Website: Kita Ward Office

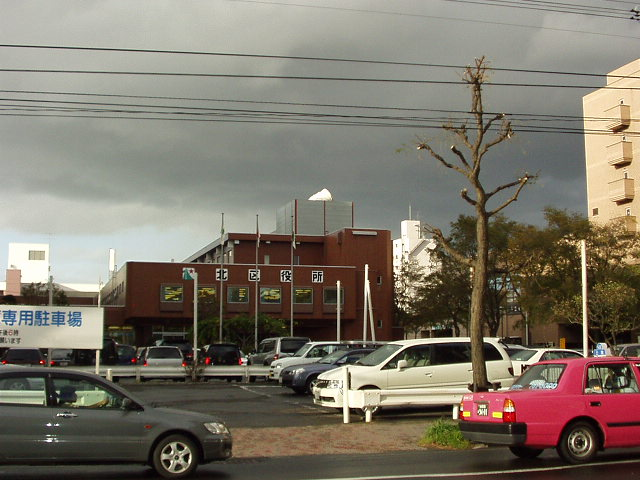
Kita-ku office (Oct. 2004)

Kita-ku (北区; lit. "north ward") is a ward of Sapporo composed of residential neighborhoods mostly arranged in grid patterns, and each built surrounding a train station, broken up by areas of farmland and some light-industrial areas. With 260,000 people, it is the most populated ward in Sapporo.

== Geography ==
Kita-ku is located in the northern part of Sapporo. The southern end of the ward is more built up, essentially a continuation of the adjoining Chūō-ku ("central ward," downtown Sapporo). Ishikari River runs through and borders the northern part of Kita-ku.

Kita-ku is subject to a colder, windier climate than the rest of Sapporo, and as one rides the JR line through towards Ainosato (the north-easternmost part of Sapporo) in winter, one can watch the intensity of the snows increase.

== Education ==
=== University ===
==== National ====
- Hokkaido University
- Hokkaido University of Education

==== Private ====
- Fuji Women's University
- Health Sciences University of Hokkaido, Sapporo Ainosato Campus

=== College ===
- Hokkaido Musashi Women's Junior College

=== High schools ===
==== Public ====
- Hokkaido Sapporo Kita High School
- Hokkaido Sapporo Hokuryo High School
- Hokkaido Sapporo Eiai High School
- Hokkaido Sapporo Technical High School
- Hokkaido Sapporo Intercultural and Technological High School
- Hokkaido Yuho High School
- Hokkaido Sapporo Shinkawa High School (city)

==== Private ====
- Sapporo Sosei High School
- Fuji High School

== Transportation ==
=== Rail ===
- JR Hokkaido
  - Hakodate Main Line: Sapporo Station
  - Sasshō Line: Shinkawa - Shin-Kotoni - Taihei - Yurigahara - Shinoro - Takuhoku - Ainosato-Kyōikudai - Ainosato-kōen
- Sapporo Municipal Subway
  - Namboku Line: Asabu - Kita-Sanjūyo-Jō - Kita-Nijūyo-Jō - Kita-Jūhachi-Jo - Kita-Jūni-Jō

=== Road ===
- Sasson Expressway: Sapporo-Kita IC - Shinkawa IC
- Route 5

== Mascot ==
Poppyi, the ward's mascot

Kita's mascot is Poppyi (ぽっぴぃ) is a bright, cute and energetic yet curious leaf fairy born from a shooting star that is fused with a leaf. She likes long walks and vegetables. Her birthday is October 21. Her charm points are her eyes and her star-shaped button. She is promoted as the mascot of the ward's health department before finally becoming the mascot of the ward in March 2019.
