= Moto-Nakagoya Station =

Railway station in Tōbetsu, Hokkaido, Japan

Moto-Nakagoya Station 本中小屋駅
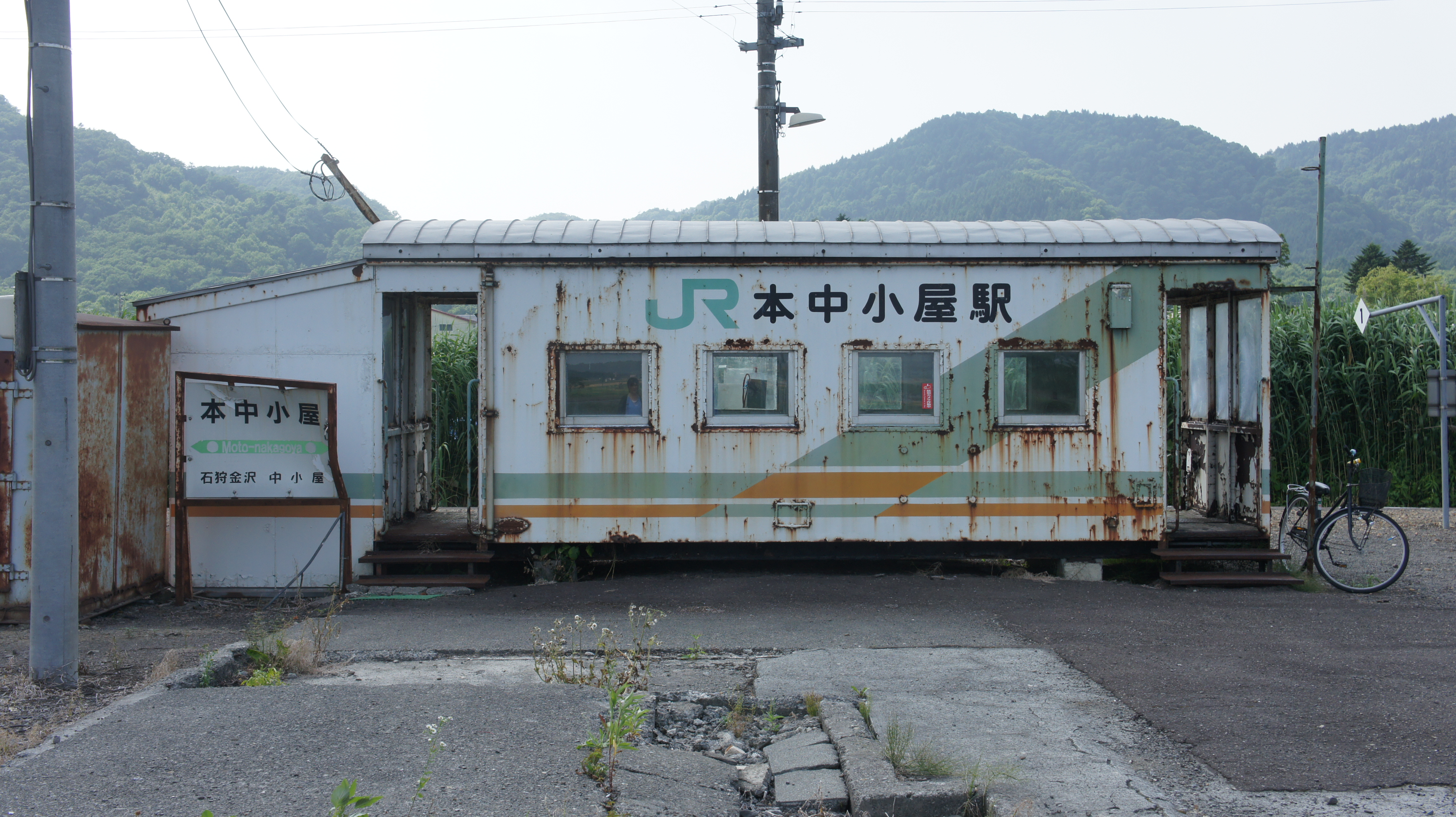
- Station building (July 2017)

General information
- Location: Japan
- Coordinates: 43.2801°N 141.5915°E
- Owner: JR Hokkaido
- Line: ■ Sasshō Line
- Distance: 35.6km from Sōen
- Platforms: 1
- Tracks: 1

History
- Opened: 3 October 1935
- Closed: 17 April 2020

Passengers
- 2013-2017: 7.0 average daily
Location

Moto-Nakagoya Station (本中小屋駅, Moto-Nakagoya-eki) was a railway station on the Sasshō Line in Tōbetsu, Ishikari District, Hokkaidō, Japan, operated by the Hokkaido Railway Company (JR Hokkaido).

== Lines ==
Moto-Nakagoya Station was served by the Sasshō Line.

== Station layout ==
The station had a side platform serving one track. The unstaffed station building was located beside the platform.

== Adjacent stations ==
«	Service	»
Sasshō Line
Ishikari-Kanazawa	-	Nakagoya

== History ==
The station opened on 3 October 1935.

In December 2018, it was announced that the station would be closed on 7 May 2020, along with the rest of the non-electrified section of the Sasshō Line. The actual last service was on 17 April 2020 amid the COVID-19 outbreak.
