= Ishikari-Kanazawa Station =

Railway station in Tōbetsu, Hokkaido, Japan

Ishikari-Kanazawa Station 石狩金沢駅
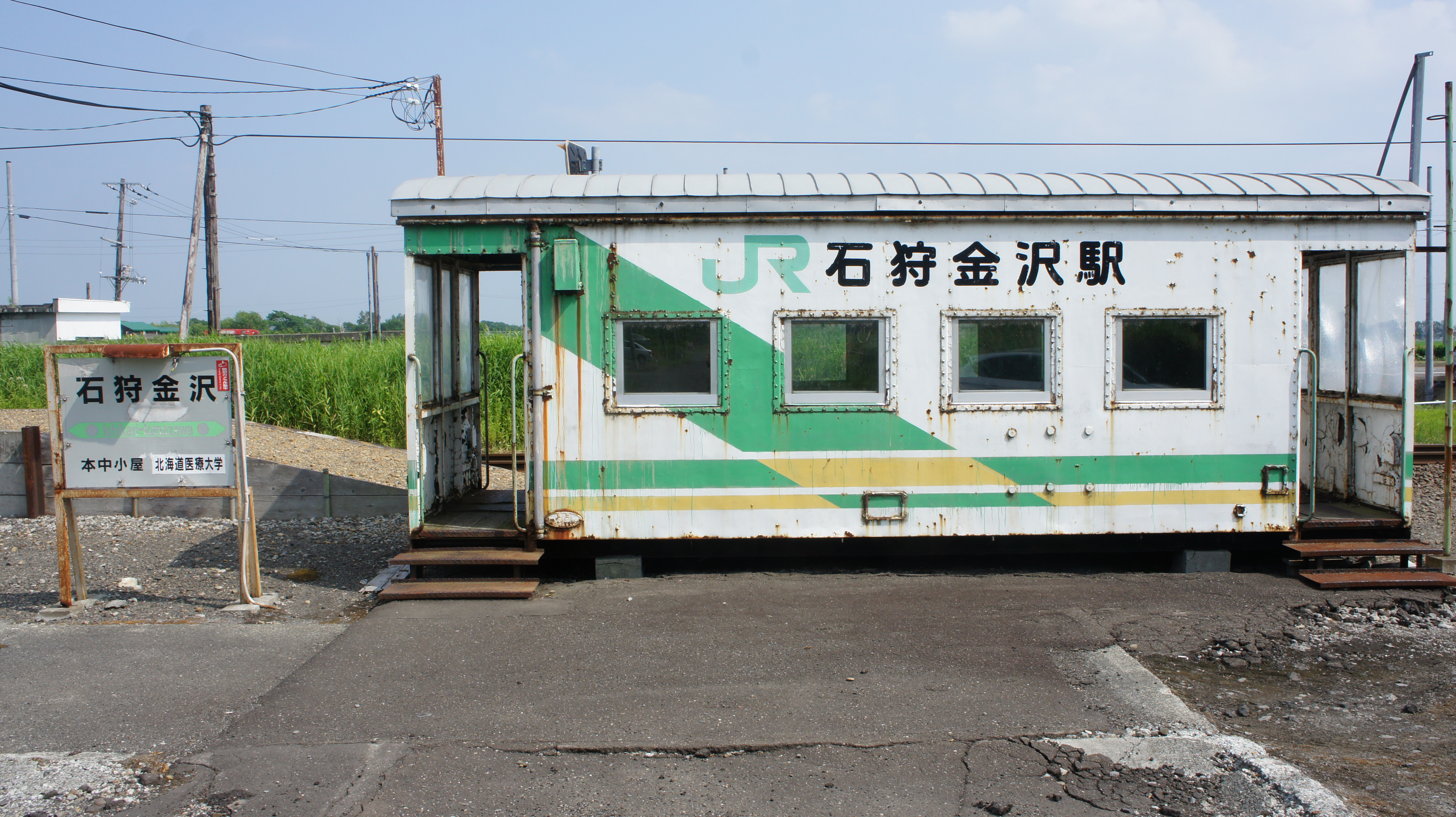
- Station building (July 2017)

General information
- Location: Japan
- Coordinates: 43.2455°N 141.5688°E
- Owner: JR Hokkaido
- Line: ■ Sasshō Line
- Distance: 31.1km from Sōen
- Platforms: 1
- Tracks: 1

History
- Opened: 3 October 1935
- Closed: 17 April 2020

Passengers
- 2013-2017: 3.2 average daily
Location

Ishikari-Kanazawa Station (石狩金沢駅, Ishikari-Kanazawa-eki) was a railway station on the Sasshō Line in Tōbetsu, Ishikari District, Hokkaidō, Japan, operated by the Hokkaido Railway Company (JR Hokkaido).

== Lines ==
Ishikari-Kanazawa Station was served by the Sasshō Line.

== Station layout ==
The station had a side platform serving one track. The unstaffed station building is located at the south end the platform.

== Adjacent stations ==
«	Service	»
Sasshō Line
Hokkaidō-Iryōdaigaku	-	Moto-Nakagoya

== History ==
The station opened on 3 October 1935.

In December 2018, it was announced that the station would be closed on 7 May 2020, along with the rest of the non-electrified section of the Sasshō Line. The actual last service was on 17 April 2020 amid the COVID-19 outbreak.
