= Ainosato-Kyōikudai Station =

Railway station in Sapporo, Japan

Ainosato-Kyōikudai Station あいの里教育大駅
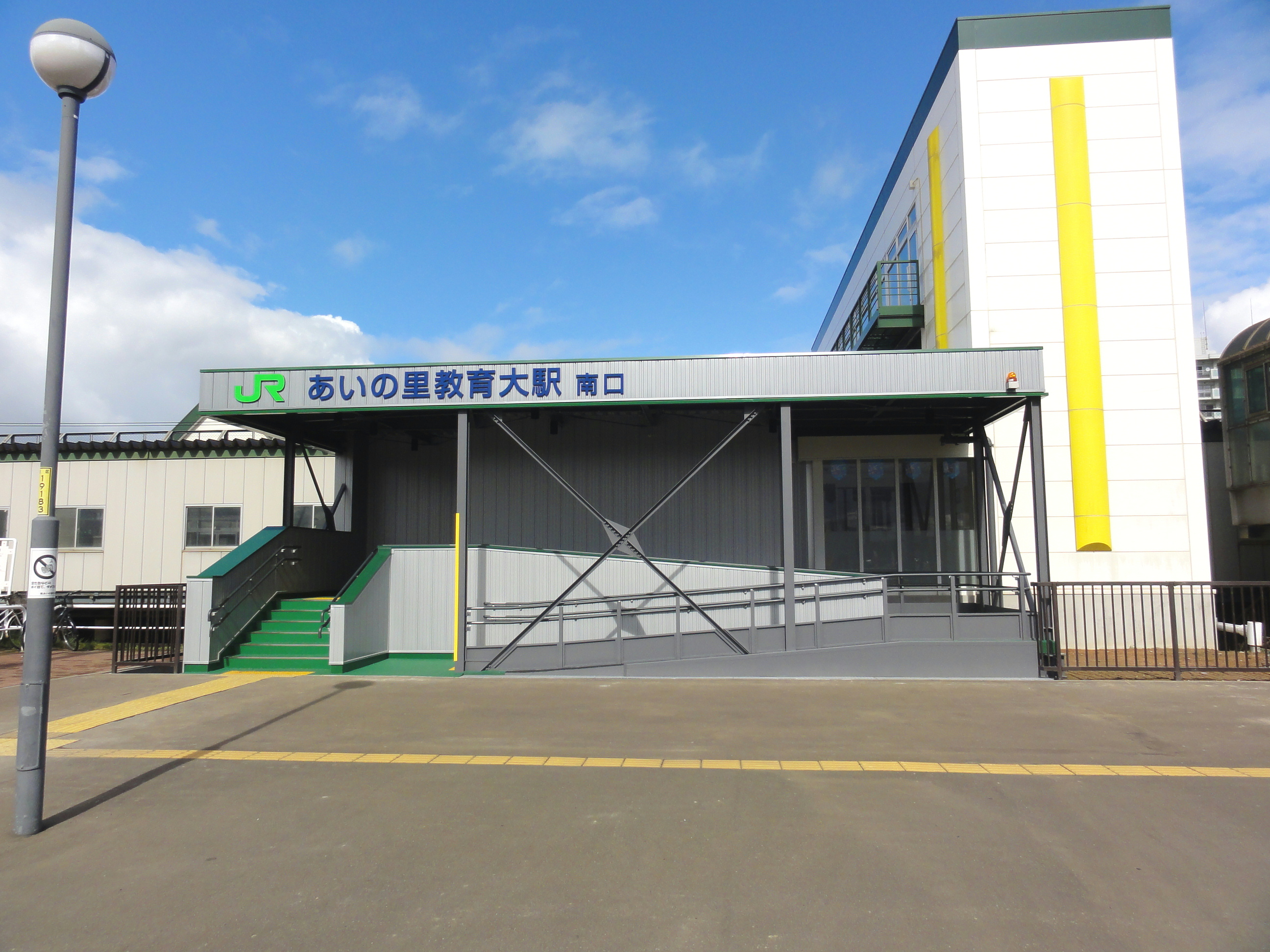
- The south entrance in October 2012

General information
- Location: Kita-ku, Sapporo, Hokkaido; Japan
- Coordinates: 43°9′19.02″N 141°23′53.95″E
- Operator: JR Hokkaido
- Line: Sasshō Line
- Distance: 13.6 km (8.5 mi) from Sōen
- Platforms: 2 side platforms
- Tracks: 2

Construction
- Structure type: At grade

Other information
- Status: Staffed
- Station code: G10
- Website: www.jrhokkaido.co.jp/network/barrier/042/ainosato-map.html

History
- Opened: 1 November 1986; 39 years ago
- Electrified: 1 June 2012; 14 years ago

Passengers
- FY2014: 3,898 daily

Services
Preceding station	JR Hokkaido	Following station
Takuhoku towards Sapporo	Sasshō Line	Ainosato-kōen towards Hokkaidō-Iryōdaigaku
Location
- Location within Hokkaido Location within Japan

Ainosato-Kyōikudai Station (あいの里教育大駅, Ainosato-Kyōikudai-eki) is a railway station on the Sasshō Line in Kita-ku, Sapporo, Hokkaido, Japan, operated by the Hokkaido Railway Company (JR Hokkaido). The station is numbered G10.

== Lines ==
Ainosato-Kyōikudai Station is served by the Sasshō Line (Gakuen Toshi Line) from Sapporo to Hokkaidō-Iryōdaigaku.

== Station layout ==
The station has two side platforms serving two tracks. The station has automated ticket machines, automated turnstiles which accept Kitaca, and a "Midori no Madoguchi" staffed ticket office.

=== Platforms ===
1	■ Sasshō Line	for Sōen and Sapporo
2	■ Sasshō Line	for Ishikari-Tōbetsu and Hokkaidō-Iryōdaigaku

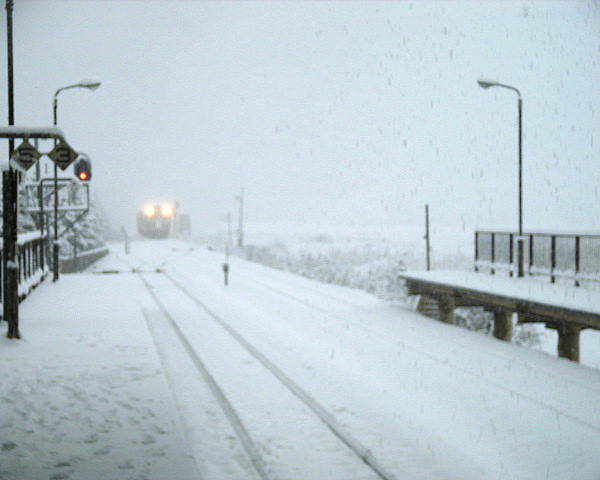
View of the platforms in December 2004

== History ==
The station opened on 1 November 1986. With the privatization of Japanese National Railways (JNR) on 1 April 1987, the station came under the control of JR Hokkaido.

Electric services commenced from 1 June 2012, following electrification of the line between Sapporo and Hokkaidō-Iryōdaigaku.

== Surrounding area ==
- Hokkaido University of Education Sapporo Campus
