= Tōbetsu Station =

Railway station in Tōbetsu, Hokkaido, Japan

Coordinates: 43.2220°N 141.5147°E

G13 Tōbetsu Station 当別駅
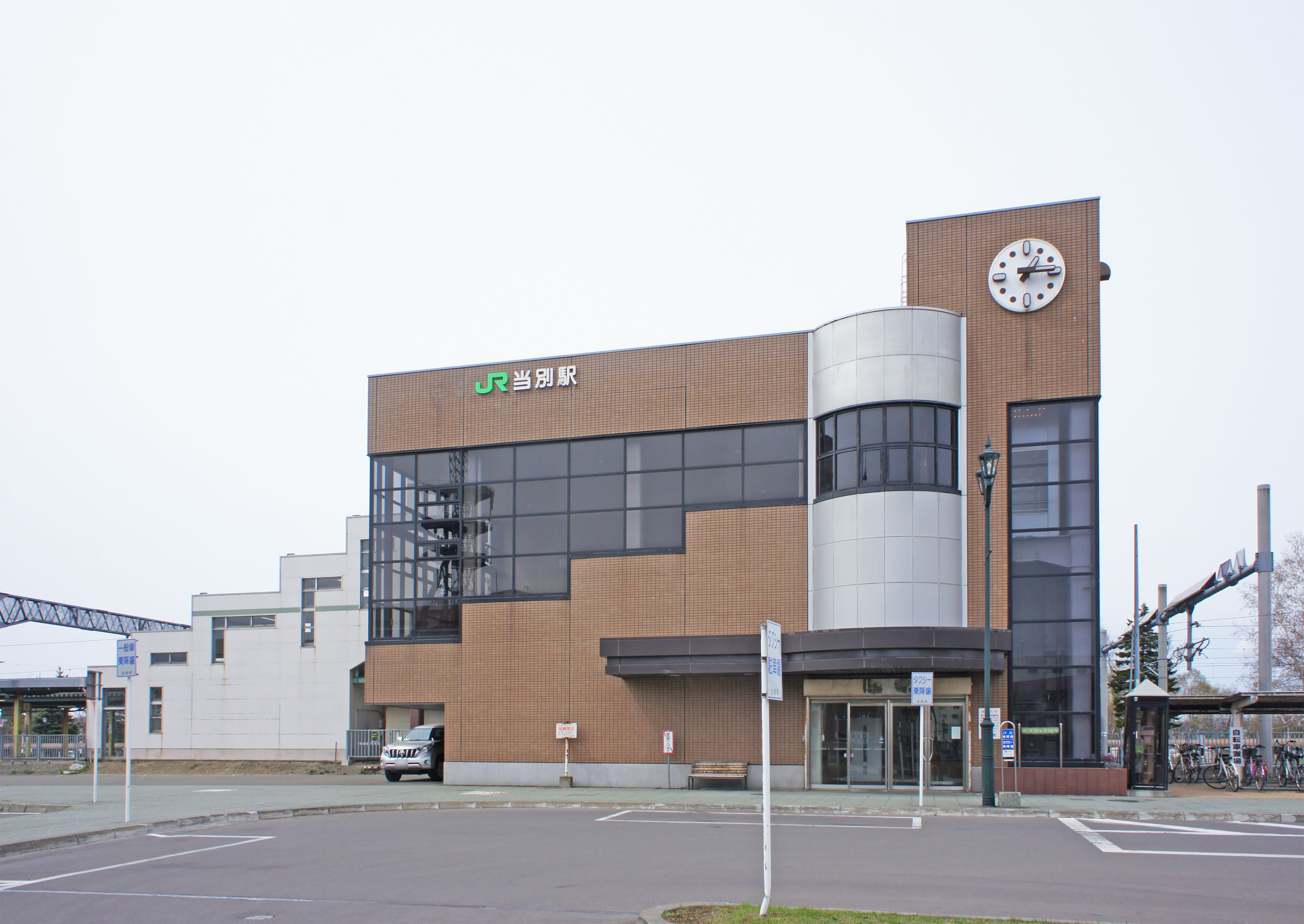
- The south entrance of Tōbetsu Station in April 2022

General information
- Location: Tōbetsu, Ishikari, Hokkaido; Japan
- Operator: JR Hokkaido
- Line: Sasshō Line
- Distance: 25.9 km (16.1 mi) from Sōen
- Platforms: 1 side + 1 island platform
- Tracks: 3

Construction
- Structure type: At grade

Other information
- Status: Staffed
- Station code: G13

History
- Opened: 20 November 1934; 91 years ago

Passengers
- FY2009: 2,340 daily

Services
Preceding station	JR Hokkaido	Following station
Futomi G12 towards Sapporo	Sasshō Line	Hokkaidō-Iryōdaigaku G14 Terminus
Location
- Location within Hokkaido Location within Japan

Tōbetsu Station (当別駅, Tōbetsu-eki) is a railway station on the Sasshō Line in Tōbetsu, Hokkaidō, Japan, operated by the Hokkaido Railway Company (JR Hokkaido). The station is numbered G13.

The name of the station has been changed from "Ishikari-Tōbetsu" to "Tōbetsu" on 12 March 2022.

== Lines ==
Tōbetsu Station is served by the Sasshō Line (Gakuen Toshi Line) from Sapporo to Hokkaidō-Iryōdaigaku.

== Station layout ==
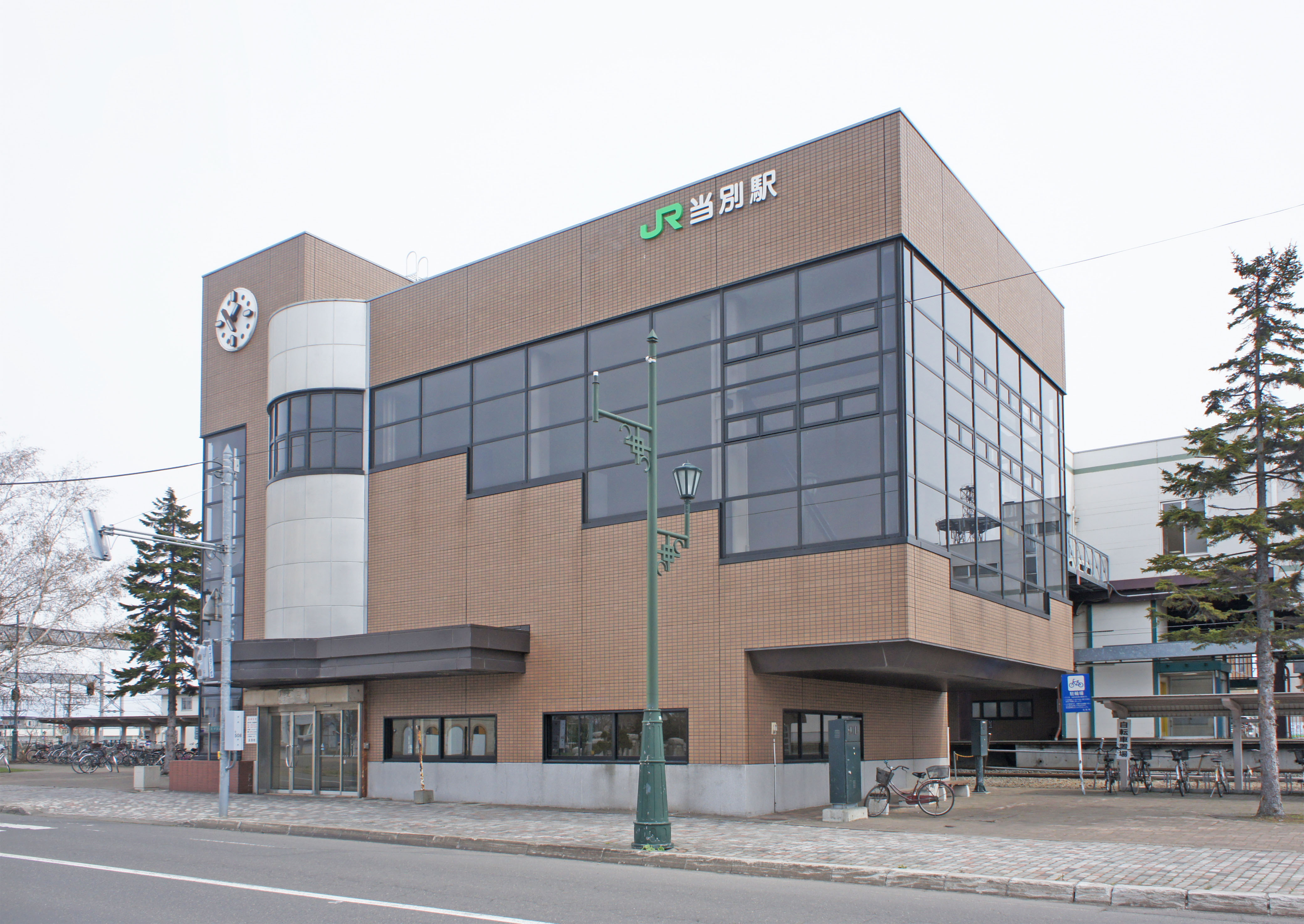
The north entrance of Tōbetsu Station in April 2022

The station has one side platform (platform 1) and one island platform (platforms 2/3) serving a total of three tracks on the otherwise single-track section of the line east of Ainosato-Kyōikudai Station. The station has automated ticket machines and Kitaca card readers and a "Midori no Madoguchi" staffed ticket office.

=== Platforms ===
1	■ Sasshō Line	for Sōen and Sapporo
2/3	■ Sasshō Line	for Hokkaidō-Iryōdaigaku

== History ==
The station opened on 20 November 1934.

Electric services commenced from 1 June 2012, following electrification of the line between Sapporo and Hokkaidō-Iryōdaigaku.

== See also ==
- List of railway stations in Japan
