= Sasshō Line =

Railway line in Hokkaido, Japan

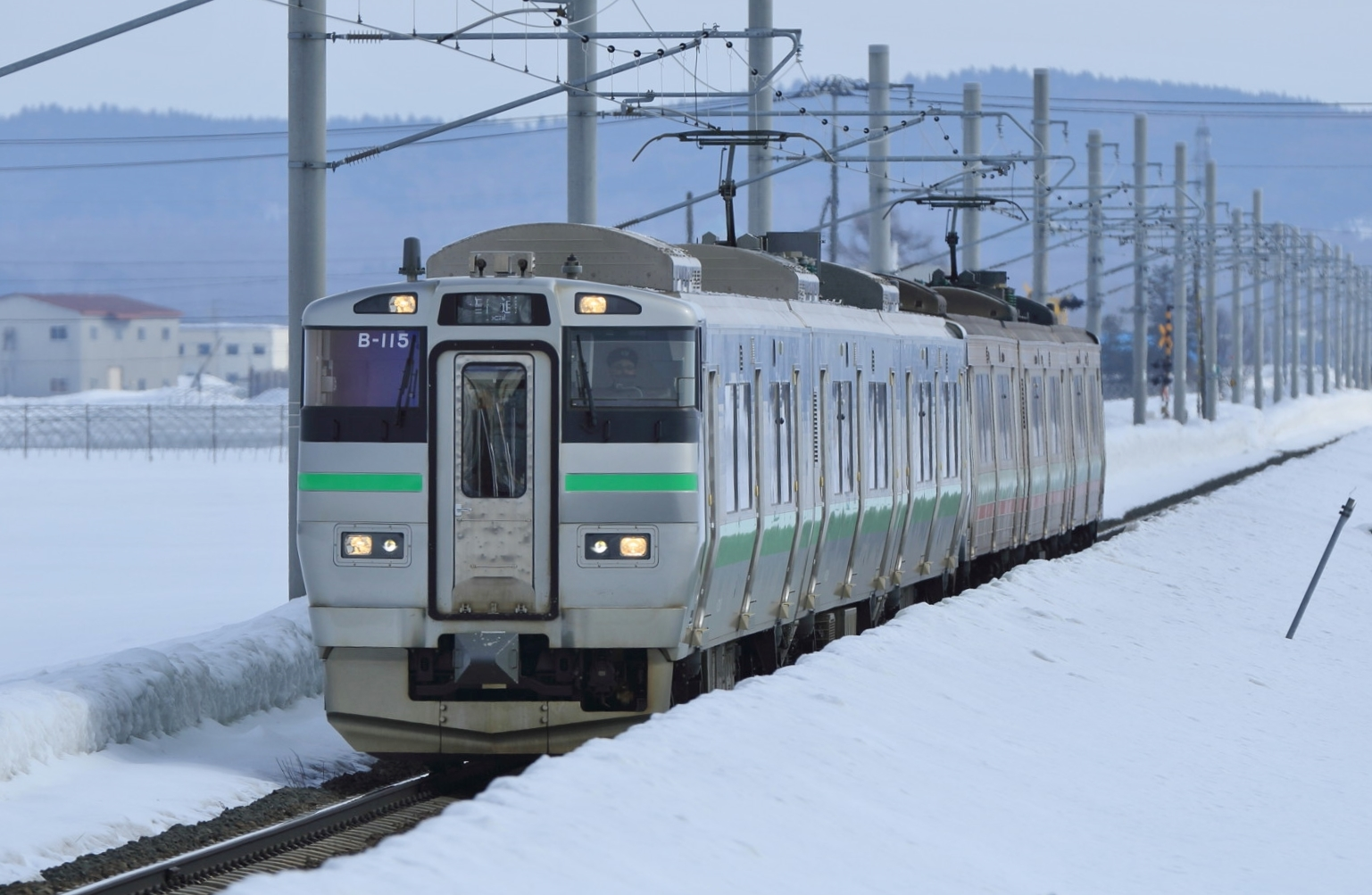
- 733 series 3-car set B-115 running in multiple with a 731 series set on the Sasshō Line, March 2014

Overview
- Other name: Gakuentoshi Line
- Native name: 札沼線
- Owner: JR Hokkaido
- Line number: G
- Locale: Hokkaido
- Termini: Sōen; Hokkaidō-Iryōdaigaku
- Stations: 14

History
- Opened: 1931; 95 years ago
- Electrified: 2012 (Sōen – Hokkaidō-Iryōdaigaku)
- Closed: 19 June 1972 (Shin-Totsukawa – Ishikari-Numata); 7 May 2020 (Hokkaidō-Iryōdaigaku – Shin-Totsukawa)

Technical
- Line length: 28.9 km (18.0 mi)
- Number of tracks: Double (Hachiken – Ainosato-Kyōikudai); Single (elsewhere)
- Track gauge: 1,067 mm (3 ft 6 in)
- Electrification: 20 kV AC overhead line
- Operating speed: 85 km/h (53 mph)
Route map

The Sasshō Line (札沼線, Sasshō-sen), commonly known as the Gakuentoshi Line (学園都市線, Gakuentoshi-sen), is a railway line in Japan operated by Hokkaido Railway Company (JR Hokkaido) which connects Sōen in Sapporo and Hokkaidō-Iryōdaigaku in Tōbetsu, Ishikari District. Its name is made up of two characters from Sapporo (札幌) and Ishikari-Numata (石狩沼田), the latter of which was the terminus of the line until it was relocated to Shin-Totsukawa in 1972.

On 19 November 2016, JR Hokkaido's president announced plans to further rationalize the line by up to 1,237 km (769 mi), a ~50% reduction in line length. The non-electrified section of the line was permanently closed on 17 April 2020.

== Stations ==
All trains, include through trains from other lines, are local trains. Sometimes, trains may skip ROYCE' Town station (marked "◌").

No.	Name	Japanese	Between (km)	Distance (km)	Transfers	Location
Sapporo to Sōen: officially Hakodate Main Line
01	Sapporo	札幌		(-1.6)	■ Chitose Line; ■ Hakodate Main Line (for Asahikawa); Subway Namboku Line ( N06 ); Subway Tōhō Line ( H07 ); Hokkaido Shinkansen (planned)	Kita-ku, Sapporo
S02	Sōen	桑園	1.6	0.0	■ Hakodate Main Line (for Otaru)	Chūō-ku, Sapporo
Sasshō Line ↓ Electrified section
G03	Hachiken	八軒	2.2	2.2		Nishi-ku, Sapporo
G04	Shinkawa	新川	1.5	3.7		Kita-ku, Sapporo
G05	Shin-Kotoni	新琴似	1.9	5.6	Namboku Line (Asabu, N01 )	Kita-ku, Sapporo
G06	Taihei	太平	1.7	7.3		Kita-ku, Sapporo
G07	Yurigahara	百合が原	1.3	8.6		Kita-ku, Sapporo
G08	Shinoro	篠路	1.6	10.2		Kita-ku, Sapporo
G09	Takuhoku	拓北	2.0	12.2		Kita-ku, Sapporo
G10	Ainosato-Kyōikudai	あいの里教育大	1.4	13.6		Kita-ku, Sapporo
G11	Ainosato-kōen	あいの里公園	1.5	15.1		Kita-ku, Sapporo
G11-1	ROYCE' Town ◌	ロイズタウン	2.8	17.9		Tōbetsu, Ishikari District
G12	Futomi	太美	1.4	19.3		Tōbetsu, Ishikari District
G13	Tōbetsu	当別	6.6	25.9		Tōbetsu, Ishikari District
G14	Hokkaidō-Iryōdaigaku	北海道医療大学	3.0	28.9		Tōbetsu, Ishikari District

=== Closed section ===
Closure date	Name	Japanese	Between (km)	Distance (km)	Transfers	Location
↓ Unelectrified section
7 May 2020	Ishikari-Kanazawa	石狩金沢	2.2	31.1		Tōbetsu; Ishikari District
7 May 2020	Moto-Nakagoya	本中小屋	4.5	35.6		Tōbetsu; Ishikari District
7 May 2020	Nakagoya	中小屋	3.2	38.8		Tōbetsu; Ishikari District
7 May 2020	Tsukigaoka	月ヶ岡	2.8	41.6		Tsukigata, Kabato District
7 May 2020	Chiraiotsu	知来乙	2.6	44.2		Tsukigata, Kabato District
7 May 2020	Ishikari-Tsukigata	石狩月形	2.1	46.3		Tsukigata, Kabato District
7 May 2020	Toyogaoka	豊ヶ岡	4.7	51.0		Tsukigata, Kabato District
7 May 2020	Sappinai	札比内	2.5	53.5		Tsukigata, Kabato District
7 May 2020	Osokinai	晩生内	4.5	58.0		Urausu, Kabato District
7 May 2020	Satteki	札的	2.9	60.9		Urausu, Kabato District
7 May 2020	Urausu	浦臼	1.8	62.7		Urausu, Kabato District
7 May 2020	Tsurunuma	鶴沼	3.4	66.1		Urausu, Kabato District
7 May 2020	Osatsunai	於札内	1.8	67.9		Urausu, Kabato District
7 May 2020	Minami-Shimo-Toppu	南下徳富	1.5	69.4		Shintotsukawa, Kabato District
7 May 2020	Shimo-Toppu	下徳富	2.1	71.5		Shintotsukawa, Kabato District
7 May 2020	Shin-Totsukawa	新十津川	5.0	76.5		Shintotsukawa, Kabato District
19 June 1972	Ishikari-Hashimoto	石狩橋本	2.7	79.2		Shintotsukawa, Kabato District
19 June 1972	Kami-Toppu	上徳富	2.8	82.0		Shintotsukawa, Kabato District
19 June 1972	Kita-Kami-Toppu	北上徳富	1.7	83.7		Shintotsukawa, Kabato District
19 June 1972	Uryū	雨竜	5.1	88.8		Uryū, Uryū District
19 June 1972	Ishikari-Oiwake	石狩追分	3.3	92.1		Uryū, Uryū District
19 June 1972	Inotsu	渭ノ津	2.4	94.5		Uryū, Uryū District
19 June 1972	Yawara	和	3.4	97.9		Hokuryū, Uryū District
19 June 1972	Nakanotai	中ノ岱	3.1	101.0		Hokuryū, Uryū District
19 June 1972	Hekisui	碧水	1.8	102.8		Hokuryū, Uryū District
19 June 1972	Hokuryū	北竜	3.2	106.0		Numata, Uryū District
19 June 1972	Gokayama	五ヶ山	2.6	108.6		Numata, Uryū District
19 June 1972	Ishikari-Numata	石狩沼田	2.8	111.4	■ ~~Rumoi Main Line~~ (Closed April 1st, 2026)	Numata, Uryū District

== Rolling stock ==
As of April 2020, the following electric multiple unit (EMU) rolling stock is used on the Sasshō Line.

- 721 series EMUs (since 1 June 2012)
- 731 series EMUs (since 1 June 2012)
- 733 series EMUs (since 1 June 2012)
- 735 series EMUs (since 1 June 2012)
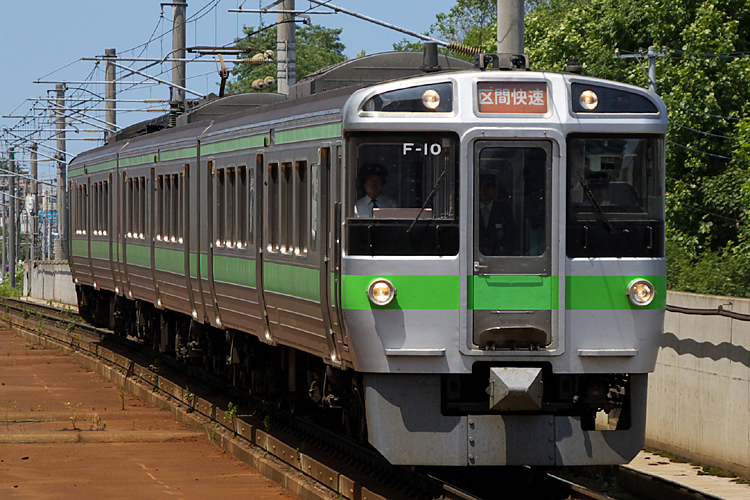
721 series EMU, July 2006

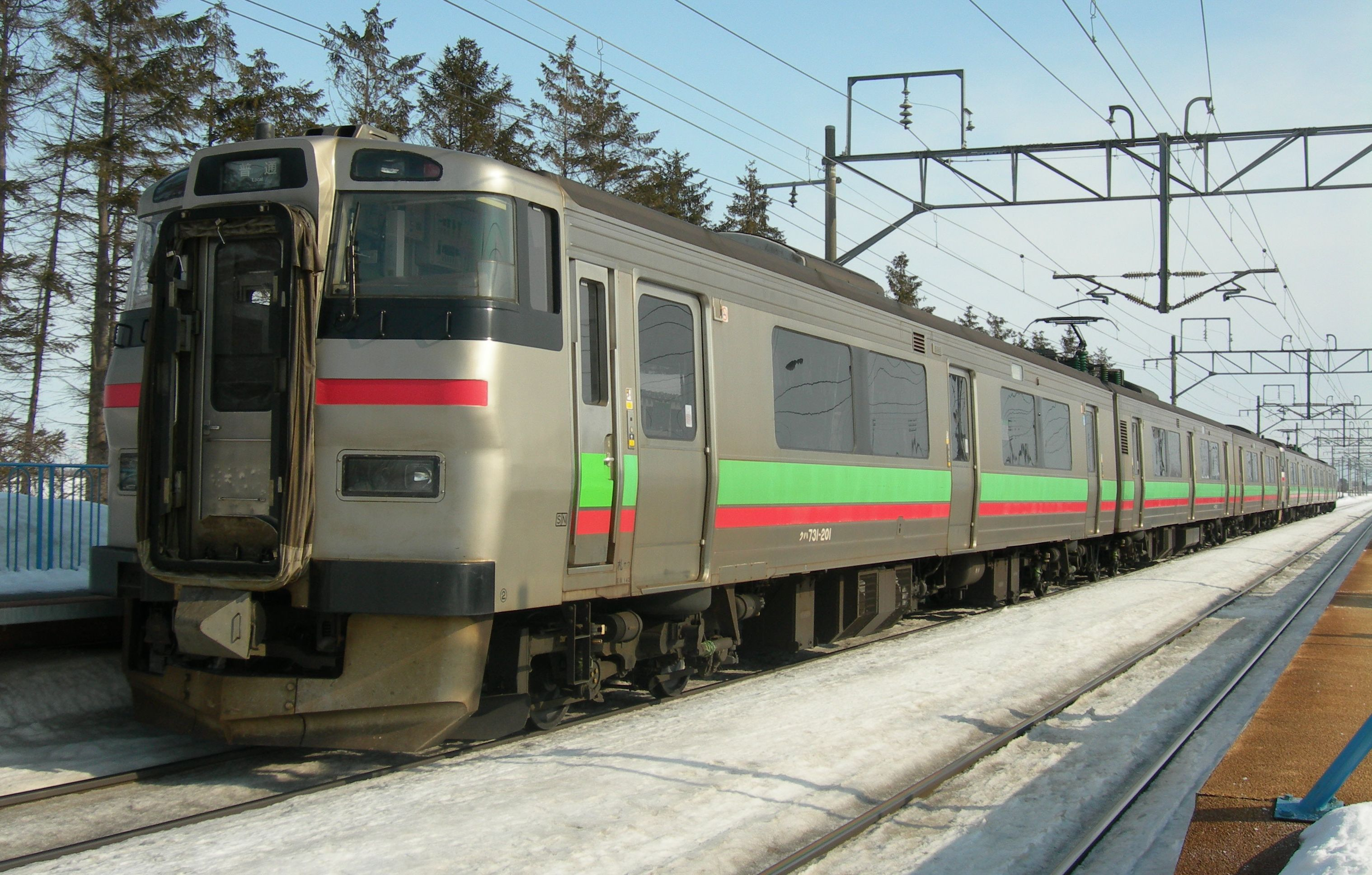
731 series EMU, March 2008

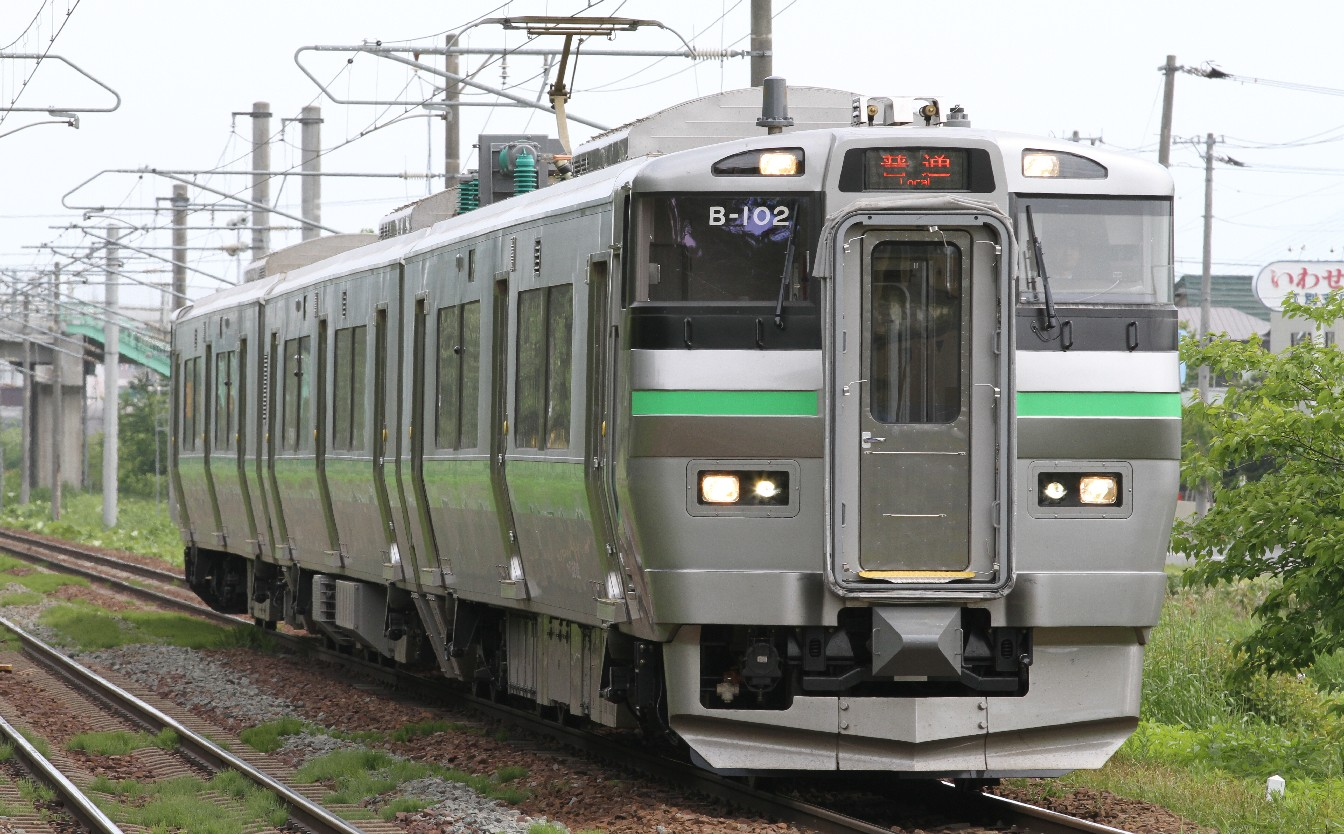
733 series EMU, June 2012

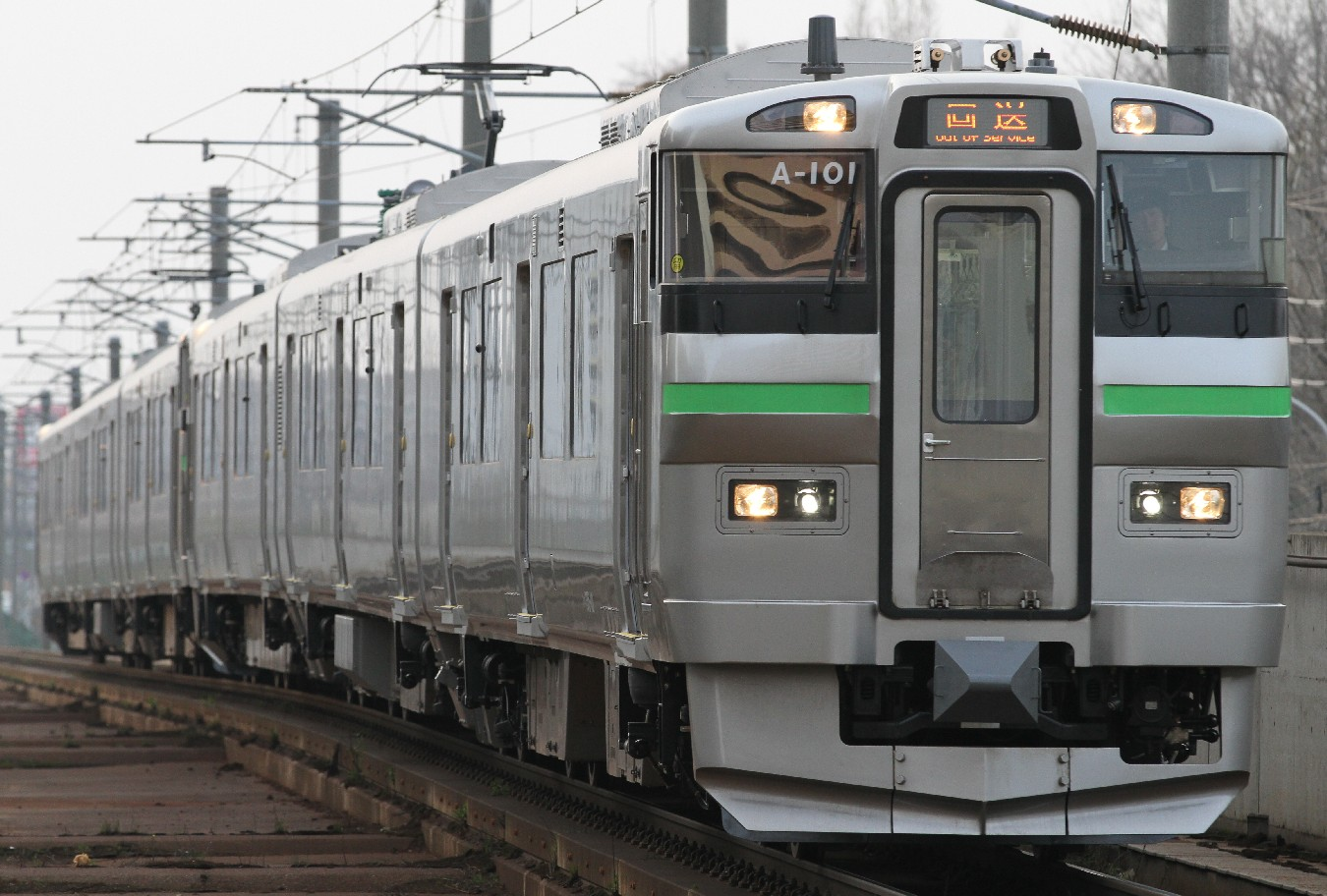
735 series EMU, May 2012

=== Former rolling stock ===
Prior to the 27 October 2012 timetable revision, and closures on 17 April 2020, the following diesel multiple unit (DMU) and EMU rolling stock was used on the Sasshō Line.

- KiHa 40 series DMUs
- KiHa 141 series DMUs
- KiHa 201 series DMUs
- 711 series EMUs
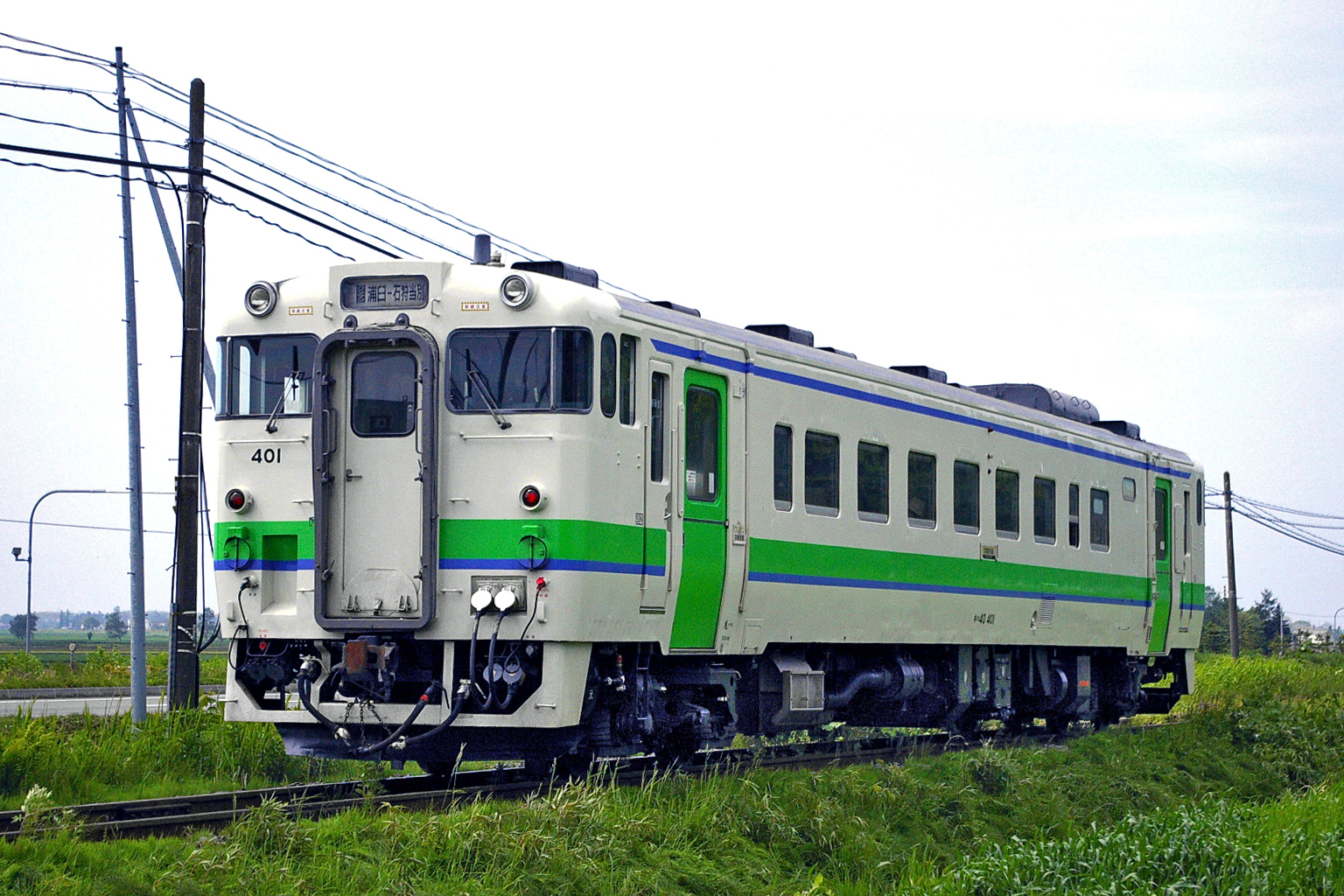
KiHa 40 series DMU

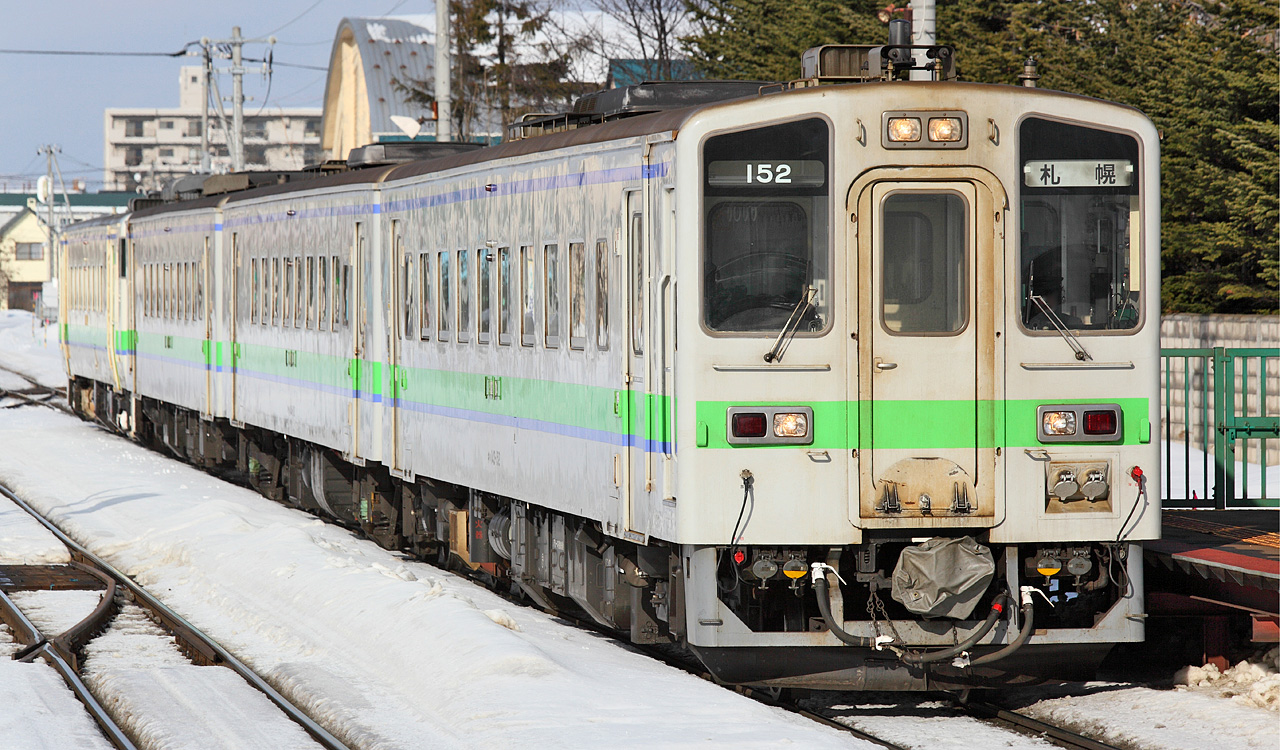
KiHa 141 series DMU, January 2010

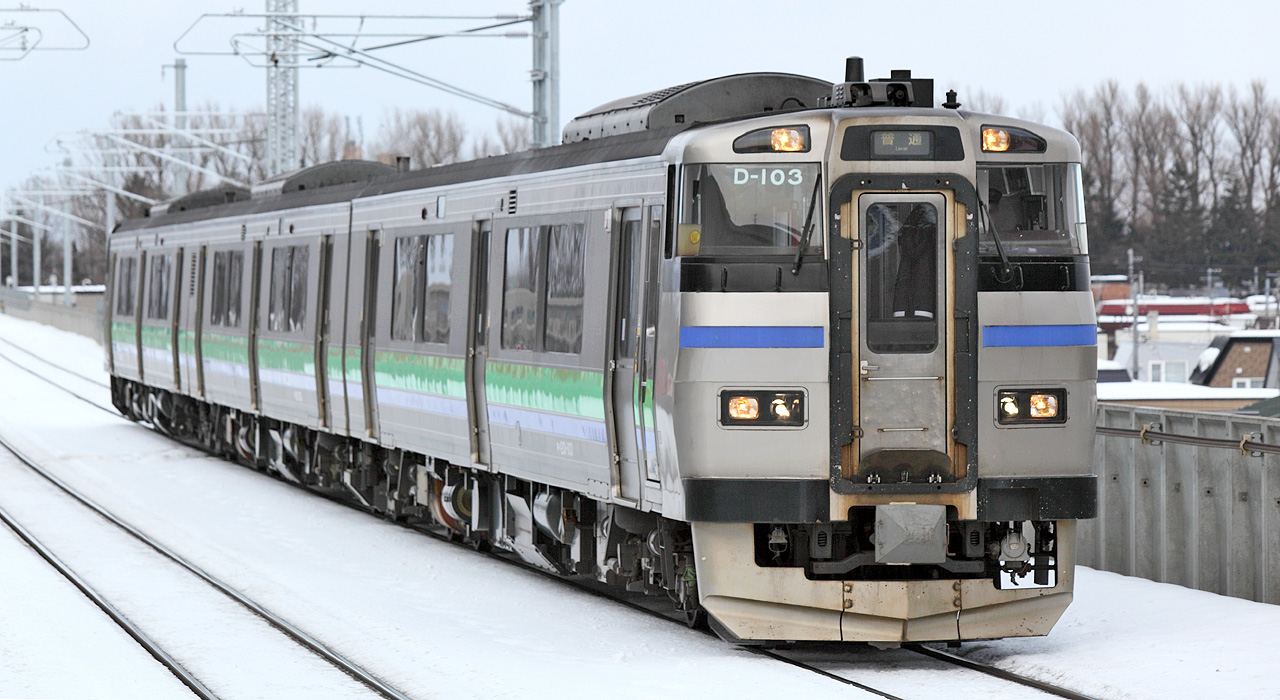
KiHa 201 series DMU, January 2010

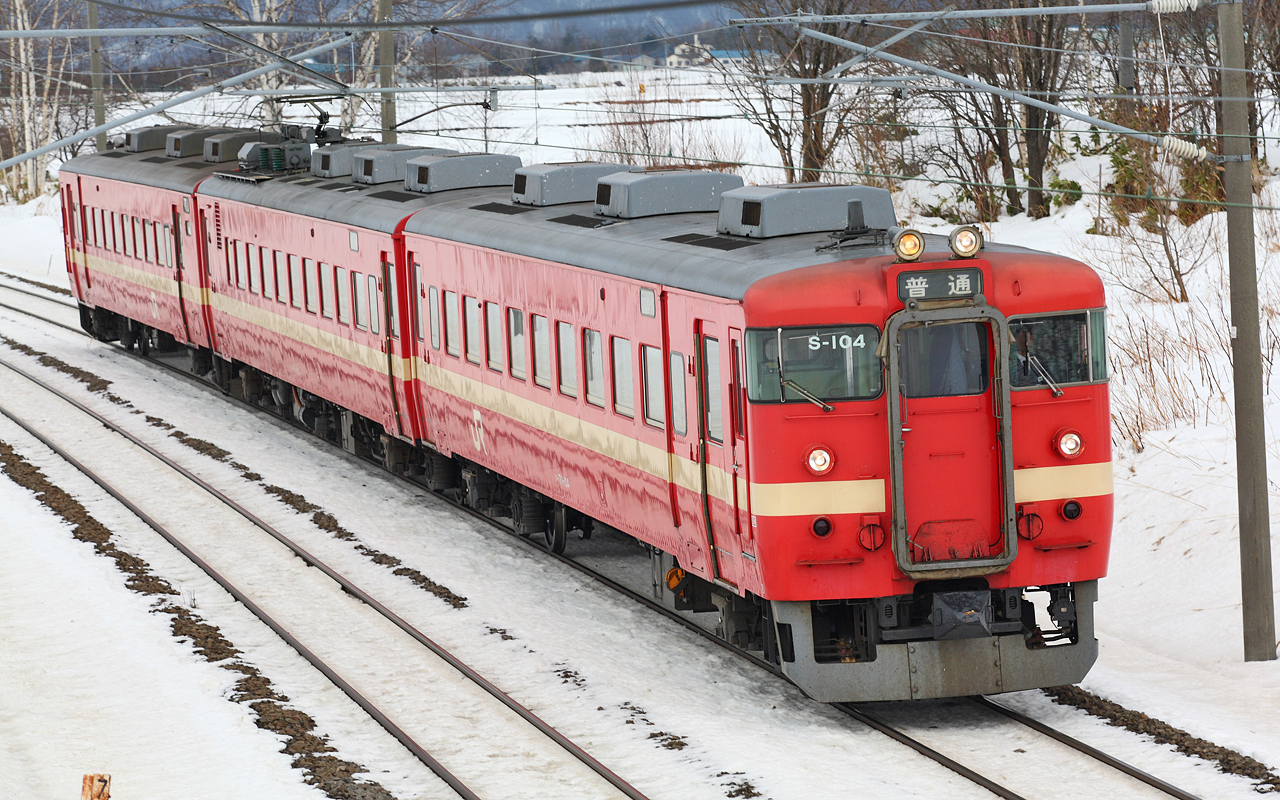
711 series EMU, January 2009

== History ==
The first part of the line to open was the northern (and now closed) section between Ishikari-Numata (on the Rumoi Main Line) to Nakatoppu (present-day Shin-Totsukawa). This opened on 10 October 1931, and was initially named the Sasshō North Line (札沼北線, Sasshō-hoku-sen). This line was extended southward from Nakatoppu to Urausu on 10 October 1934, and the Soen to Ishikari-Tobetsu section, initially named Sasshō South Line (札沼南線, Sasshō-nan-sen), opened on 20 November 1934. The section between Urausu and Ishikari-Tobetsu opened on 3 October 1935, linking the north and south lines, which were unified as the "Sasshō Line".

Nakatoppu Station was renamed Shin-Totsukawa in 1953.

The section between Shin-Totsukawa and Ishikari-Numata was closed on 1 April 1972.

With the privatization of JNR on 1 April 1987, ownership of line was transferred to JR Hokkaido.

=== Duplication ===
The section between Hachiken and Ainosato-Kyoikudai was double-tracked between 1995 and 2000.

=== Electrification ===
The line was electrified over the 28.9 km section from Sōen Station to Hokkaidō-Iryōdaigaku Station in 2012, with engineering work completed by March 2012. New 733 series EMUs were introduced from June 2012, with all trains operated using EMUs from the start of the revised timetable on 27 October 2012.

=== Part Closure in 2020 ===
JR Hokkaido had been planning to permanently close the section between Hokkaido-Iryodaigaku and Shin-Totsukawa on 7 May 2020, but the company moved closure forward to 17 April due to the COVID-19 outbreak.

=== Former connecting lines ===
- Shinkotoni Station: An 11 km horse-drawn 762 mm (2 ft 6 in) gauge line operated from Sapporo north west to Kawabata, opening in 1911 and crossing the Sassho Line near Shinkotoni. Petrol locomotives were introduced in 1922. The line was replaced by buses in 1943.
- Tobetsu Station: A 31 km 762 mm gauge line was opened to Obukuro in sections between 1949 and 1952. Typhoon Marie (1954) caused significant damage to the line, and repair was considered impractical. The line was formally closed in 1958. An 11 km 762 mm gauge line operated to Ebetsu, on the Hakodate Main Line, although at each terminus, the 762 mm gauge stations were on the opposite banks of the Tobetsugawa and Ishikarigawa rivers (respectively) to the JR stations.
