= Hokkaido Musashi Women's Junior College =

Private junior women's college in Sapporo, Hokkaido, Japan

Coordinates: 43°5′13.1″N 141°19′47.1″E

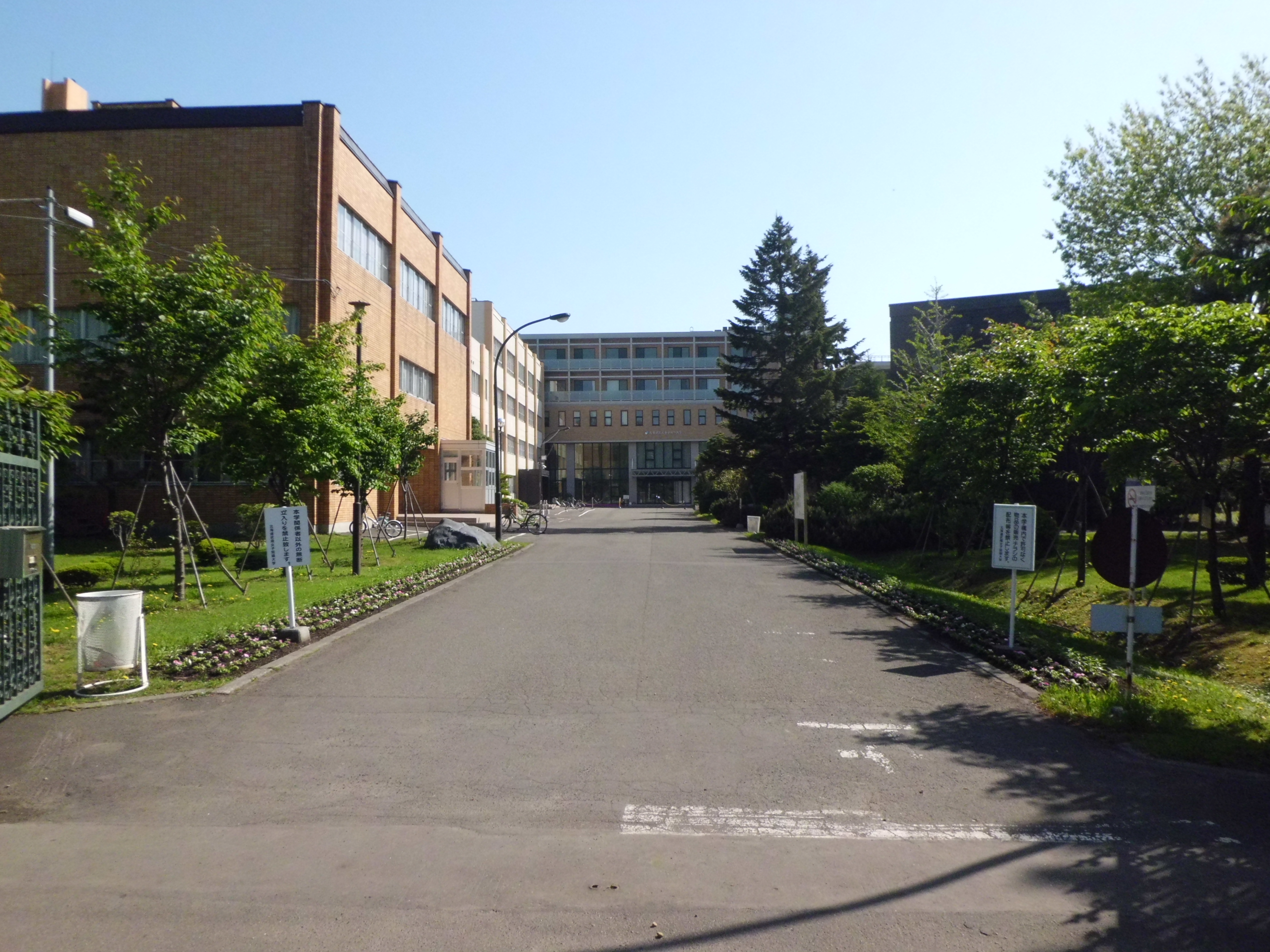

Hokkaido Musashi Women's Junior College (北海道武蔵女子短期大学, Hokkaido musashi joshi tanki daigaku) is a private junior women's college in Sapporo, Hokkaido, Japan, established in 1967.
