= Hokkaidō-Iryōdaigaku Station =

Railway station in Tōbetsu, Hokkaido, Japan

Hokkaidō-Iryōdaigaku Station 北海道医療大学駅
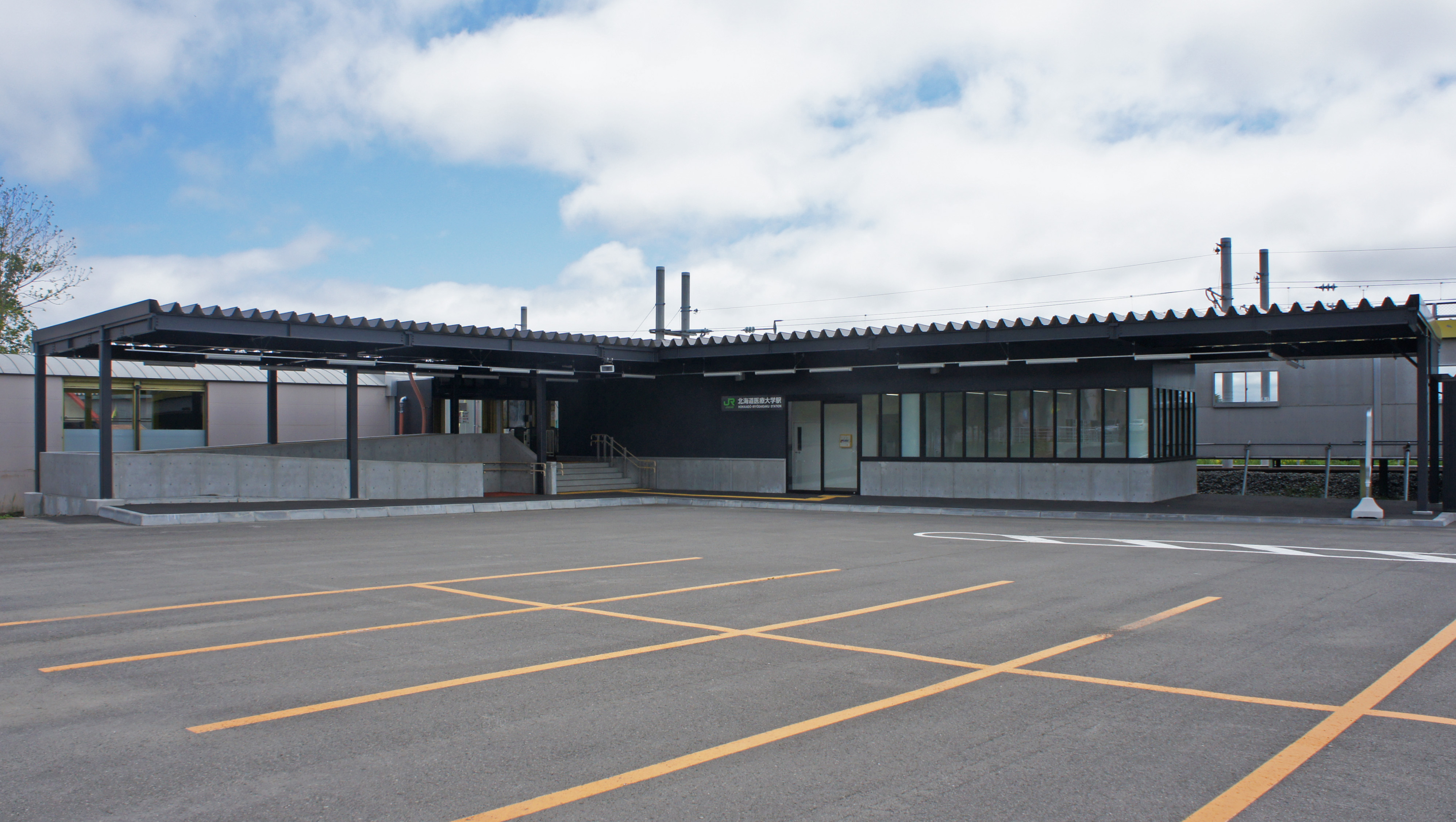
- The station in May 2020

General information
- Location: Tōbetsu, Ishikari District; Hokkaido Prefecture; Japan
- Coordinates: 43.2310°N 141.5494°E
- Operator: JR Hokkaido
- Line: Sasshō Line
- Distance: 28.9 km (18.0 mi) from Sōen
- Platforms: 2 side platforms
- Tracks: 2

Construction
- Structure type: At grade

Other information
- Status: Unstaffed
- Station code: G14

History
- Opened: 1 December 1981; 44 years ago
- Former names: Daigakumae

Passengers
- 2014-2018: 2,283.8 avg daily

Services
Preceding station	JR Hokkaido	Following station
Tōbetsu towards Sapporo	Sasshō Line	Terminus
Former Services
Preceding station	JR Hokkaido	Following station
Tōbetsu towards Sapporo	Sasshō Line Former	Ishikari-Kanazawa towards Shin-Totsukawa
Location
- Location within Hokkaido Location within Japan

Hokkaidō-Iryōdaigaku Station (北海道医療大学駅, Hokkaidō-Iryōdaigaku-eki) is a railway station on the Sasshō Line in Tōbetsu, Hokkaidō, Japan, operated by the Hokkaido Railway Company (JR Hokkaido). The station is numbered G14 and serves the Tōbetsu Campus of the Health Sciences University of Hokkaido (HSUH). Since the closure of the non-electrified portion of the railway between Shin-Totsukawa and this station on May 7, 2020, it has been the northern terminus of the line.

== Description ==
Hokkaidō-Iryōdaigaku Station is served by the Sasshō Line (Gakuen Toshi Line) from Sapporo.

== Station layout ==
The station has two staggered side platforms serving two tracks. Both platforms can serve 6-car electrified trains. Platform 1 is the only track connected to the non-electrified single-track former section of the line towards Shin-Totsukawa; Platform 2 is a bay platform opened on 1 December 1995, serving the electrified line towards Sapporo. After the closure of the non-electrified section, both platforms serve trains towards Sapporo. The station has automated ticket machines and Kitaca card readers (not equipped with regular ticket gates). An overpass directly connects the HSUH to the station. The station is unattended and managed from Tōbetsu.

=== Platforms ===
1	■ Sasshō Line	for Tōbetsu, Sōen, and Sapporo
2	■ Sasshō Line	for Tōbetsu, Sōen, and Sapporo

== History ==
The station opened on 1 April 1982, initially named Daigakumae Station (大学前駅).

Electric services commenced from 1 June 2012, following electrification of the line between Sapporo and this station.

In December 2018, it was announced that the station would become the terminus station of the Sasshō Line as a result of the closure of the non-electrified section of the line in May 2020. Services ceased from 18 April 2020 due to the COVID-19 crisis; the section was officially closed on 7 May 2020 as planned. The HSUH is planned to be relocated to Kitahiroshima by August 2028, and JR Hokkaido plans to rename the station when the relocation takes place.

== Surrounding area ==
- Health Sciences University of Hokkaido, after which the station is named
- National Route 275
