= Sapporo Station =

Major railway station in Sapporo, Japan

Coordinates: 43°04′07″N 141°21′02.8″E

01 Sapporo Station 札幌駅
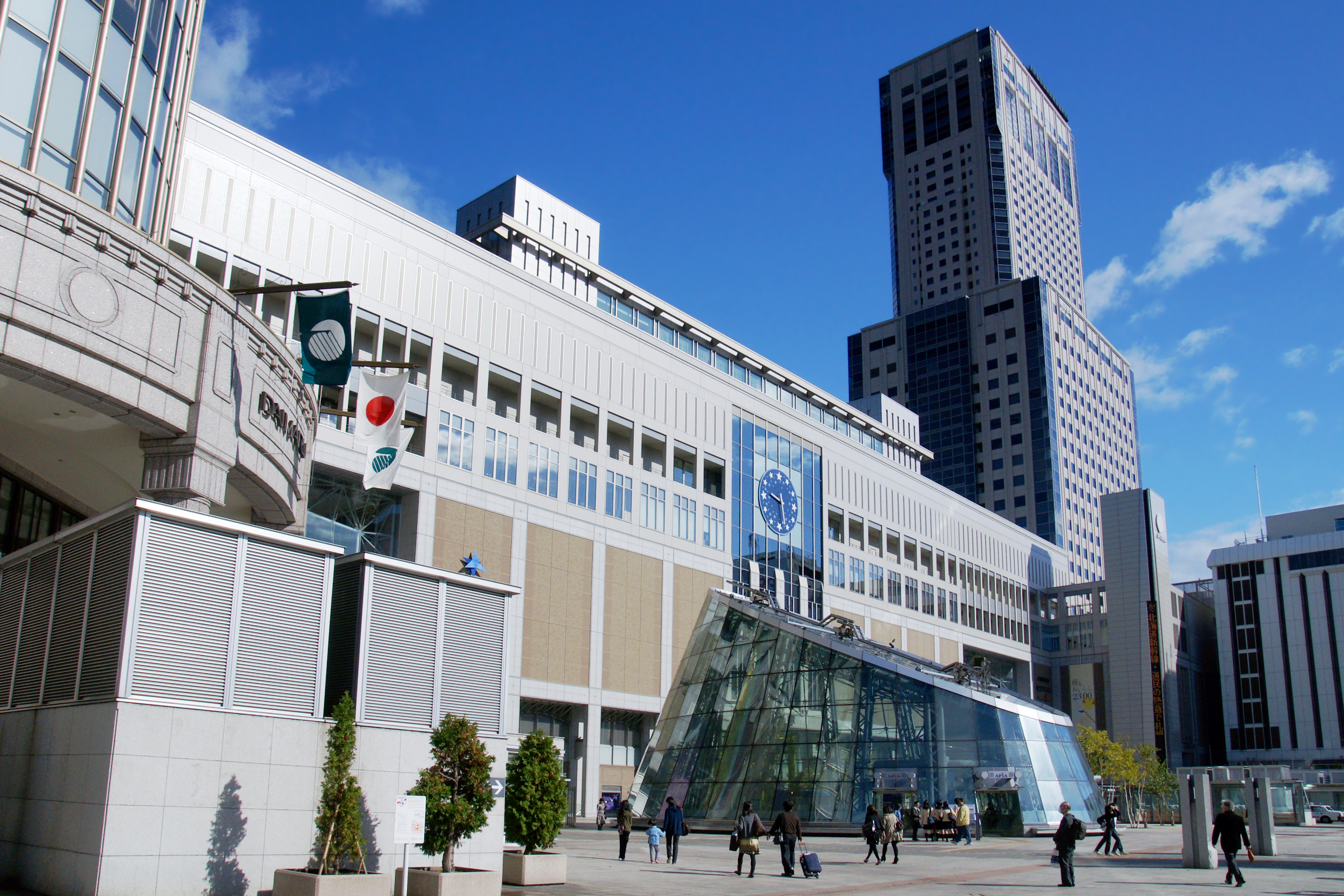
- The south side of Sapporo Station in October 2009

Japanese name
- Shinjitai: 札幌駅
- Kyūjitai: 札幌驛
- Hiragana: さっぽろえき

General information
- Location: Kita-ku, Sapporo, Hokkaido; Japan
- Operator: JR Hokkaido
- Lines: ■■ Hakodate Main Line; Chitose Line; Sasshō Line; Hokkaido Shinkansen (Opens in 2038)
- Platforms: 3 island platforms, 2 side platforms
- Tracks: 10
- Connections: Sapporo Subway Station

Construction
- Structure type: Elevated

Other information
- Status: Staffed (Midori no Madoguchi)
- Station code: 01

History
- Opened: 28 November 1880; 145 years ago

Passengers
- FY2015: 95,288 daily

Services
Preceding station	JR Hokkaido	Following station
Local
Naebo towards Numanohata or New Chitose Airport	Chitose Line Local	Terminus
Sōen towards Hakodate	Hakodate Main Line Local	Naebo towards Asahikawa
Terminus	Sasshō Line Local	Sōen towards Hokkaidō-Iryōdaigaku
Rapid
Shin-Sapporo towards New Chitose Airport	Semi-Rapid Airport	Terminus
Shiroishi towards New Chitose Airport	Rapid Airport	Sōen towards Otaru
Shin-Sapporo towards New Chitose Airport	Special Rapid Airport	Sōen towards Otaru
Kotoni towards Kutchan	Niseko Liner	Terminus
Limited Express
Shin-Sapporo towards Hakodate	Hokuto	Terminus
Terminus	Ōzora	Shin-Sapporo towards Kushiro
Shin-Sapporo towards Higashi-Muroran	Suzuran	Terminus
Terminus	Tokachi	Shin-Sapporo towards Obihiro
Terminus	Lilac	Iwamizawa towards Asahikawa
Terminus	Sōya	Iwamizawa towards Wakkanai
Terminus	Okhotsk	Iwamizawa towards Abashiri
Terminus	Kamui	Iwamizawa towards Asahikawa

Future service
Preceding station	JR Hokkaido	Following station
Shin-Otaru towards Shin-Aomori	Hokkaido Shinkansen Opens 2038	Terminus
Location
- Location within Sapporo Location within Hokkaido Location within Japan

Sapporo Station (札幌駅, Sapporo-eki) is a major railway station in Kita-ku, Sapporo, Hokkaido, Japan. It is served by Hakodate Main Line and other lines of Hokkaido Railway Company (JR Hokkaido), and is also connected to the Subway Sapporo Station.

Sapporo Station is the starting point and terminus for most limited express services operated by JR Hokkaido. It also has the tallest building (JR Tower) in Hokkaido. Sapporo station is developing into a commercial center as large as Ōdōri Park and Susukino.

== Lines and trains ==
The following JR Hokkaido lines and trains pass through or terminate at Sapporo Station:

■■ Hakodate Main Line

- Okhotsk limited express (Sapporo – Abashiri)
- Sōya limited express (Sapporo – Wakkanai)
- Kamui limited express (Sapporo – Asahikawa)
- Lilac limited express (Sapporo – Asahikawa)
- Niseko Liner rapid (Rankoshi, Kutchan – Sapporo)

Chitose Line

- Hokuto limited express (Hakodate – Sapporo)
- Ōzora limited express (Sapporo – Kushiro)
- Tokachi limited express (Sapporo – Obihiro)
- Suzuran limited express (Muroran – Sapporo)
- Airport semi-rapid (New Chitose Airport – Sapporo)
- Airport rapid (New Chitose Airport – Sapporo – Otaru)
- Airport special rapid (New Chitose Airport – Sapporo – Otaru)

Sasshō Line (Gakuen Toshi Line)

== Layout ==
Sapporo Station consists of five platforms that are raised above street level. These raised platforms serve 10 tracks which run in an east–west direction. Two concourses run north–south below the platforms. It has a commercial facility called Paseo under the ground and JR Tower on the south side of the station. The station is also planned to become a new high-rise building and a terminal station of the Hokkaido Shinkansen that is scheduled to open in 2038.

On 16 October, 2022, due to construction of the Hokkaido Shinkansen extension to Sapporo, Platform 11 opened for passengers while Platform 1 was discontinued. The new platform can accommodate trains up to six cars long.

=== Platforms ===
2-4	■ Hakodate Main Line	for Teine and Otaru
5-8	■ Chitose Line	for Minami-Chitose, New Chitose Airport and Tomakomai
9-10	■ Hakodate Main Line	for Ebetsu, Iwamizawa and Asahikawa
11	■ Sasshō Line (Gakuen Toshi Line)	for Hokkaidō-Iryōdaigaku

== History ==
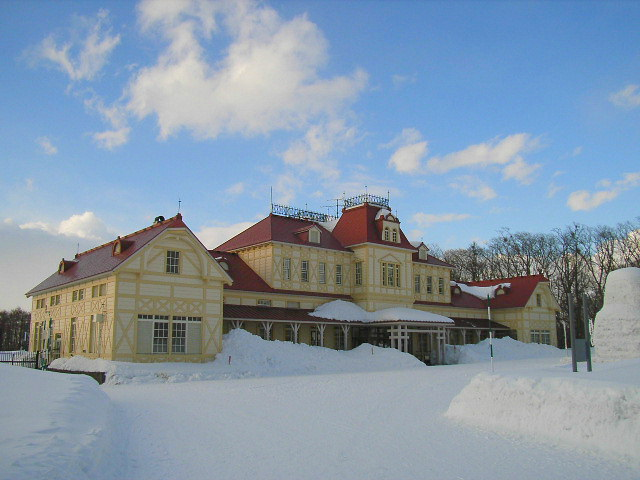
A reduced-size replica of Sapporo Station 1908 (Historical Village of Hokkaido)

Sapporo Station opened on 28 November 1880 as a terminus of the Horonai Railway. A new station building was built in 1881 and it was enlarged as Sapporo developed. In 1908, the station building was rebuilt because of a fire in 1907. The restored building can be found in the Historical Village of Hokkaido in Nopporo Forest Park.

The third reconstruction was finished in 1951 and the Sapporo Subway was opened in 1971. An underground shopping center was started in 1972, and a commercial building was opened on the east side of the station in 1978.

With the privatization of JNR on 1 April 1987, the station came under the control of JR Hokkaido.

The current building was built in 2003.

Overnight sleeping car trains Cassiopeia, Hokutosei, and Hamanasu served the station prior to their discontinuation.

== Surrounding area ==
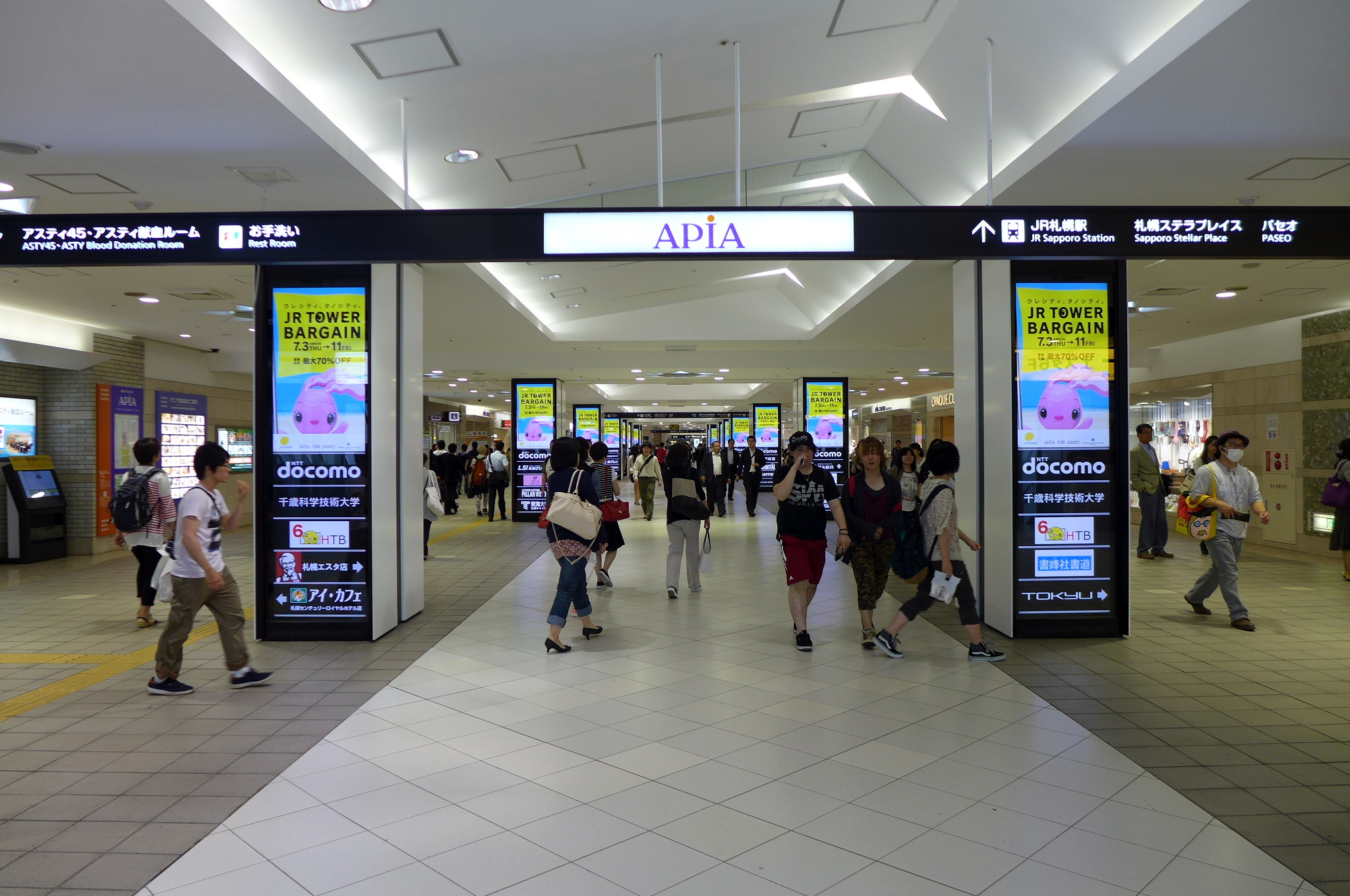
APIA underground Shopping Arcade

- Subway Sapporo Station
- Sapporo station Bus Terminal
- National Route 5 (to Hakodate)
- Hokkaido Development Bureau building
- Hokkaido University
- Hokkaido Police Headquarters
- Sapporo Central Post Office
- Sapporo 1 building, (Sapporo Government Office building)
- Sapporo agricultural cooperative association (JA Sapporo), Chuo branch
- Sapporo JR Tower
- Sapporo Stellar Place, shopping mall
- Daimaru store, Sapporo branch
- Sapporo Cinema Frontier
- Sapporo Esta, shopping center
- Tokyu Department Store, Sapporo branch
- Asty 45, building
- PASEO, shopping center
- APIA, shopping center
- Hotel New Otani Sapporo

== Sapporo station bus terminal ==
=== Highway buses ===
- Iwamizawa; For Iwamizawa Station
- Mikasa; For Iwamizawa Station and Mikasa
- Bibai; For Bibai Station
- Furano; For Iwamizawa, Sunagawa, Higashi-Takikawa Station, Akabira Station, Ashibetsu Station, and Furano Station
- Kuriyama; For Kurisawa Station and Kuriyama Station
- Yubari; For Kuriyama Station, Shikanotani Station, and Yūbari Station
- Takikawa; For Takikawa Station
- Shintotsukawa; For Takikawa and Shintotsukawa
- Rumoi; For Takikawa, Fukagawa, and Rumoi Station
- Asahikawa; For Asahikawa Station
- Engaru; For Shirataki and Engaru Station
- Nayoro; For Wassamu Station, Kenbuchi, Shibetsu, Fūren Station, and Nayoro Station
- Ryuhyo Monbetsu; For Takinoue and Monbetsu
- Haboro; For Mashike Station, Rumoi Station, Obira, Tomamae, Haboro, Shosanbetsu, Enbetsu, Teshio, and Toyotomi Station
- Muroran/Muroran Soccer/Hakucho; For Noboribetsu Station, Higashi-Muroran Station, and Muroran Station
- Tomakomai/Haskap; For Tomakomai Station and Tomakoma Ferry Terminal
- Hakodate; For Yakumo, Mori, Nanai Station, Goryōkaku Station, Hakodate Station, and Yunokawa Onsen
- Pegasus; For Mukawa, Tomikawa Station, Kiyohata Station, Shizunai Station, Hidaka-mitsuishi Station, and Urakawa Station
- Hidaka; For Mukawa, Tomikawa Station, Biratori, and Hidaka
- Date Liner; For Datemombetsu Station
- Otaru; For Otaru-Chikkō Station, Otaru Station
- Yoichi; For Ranshima Station, Yoichi Station, Umekawa, and Toyohama
- Shakotan; For Ranshima Station, Yoichi, Furubira, and Shakotan
- Iwanai; For Rashima, Yoichi, Kyōwa, and Iwanai
- Niseko; For Otaru Station, Yoichi, Niki, Kyowa, Kutchan, and Niseko
- Hiroo Santa; For Urakawa and Hiroo
- Erimo; For Hidaka-horobetsu Station, Samani Station, and Erimo
- Starlight Kushiro; For Shiranuka Station, Otanoshike Station, and Kushiro Station

== See also ==
- Sapporo Station (Sapporo Municipal Subway)
- List of railway stations in Japan
