= Sōen Station =

Railway station in Sapporo, Japan

Coordinates: 43°04′15″N 141°19′55″E

Sōen Station 桑園駅
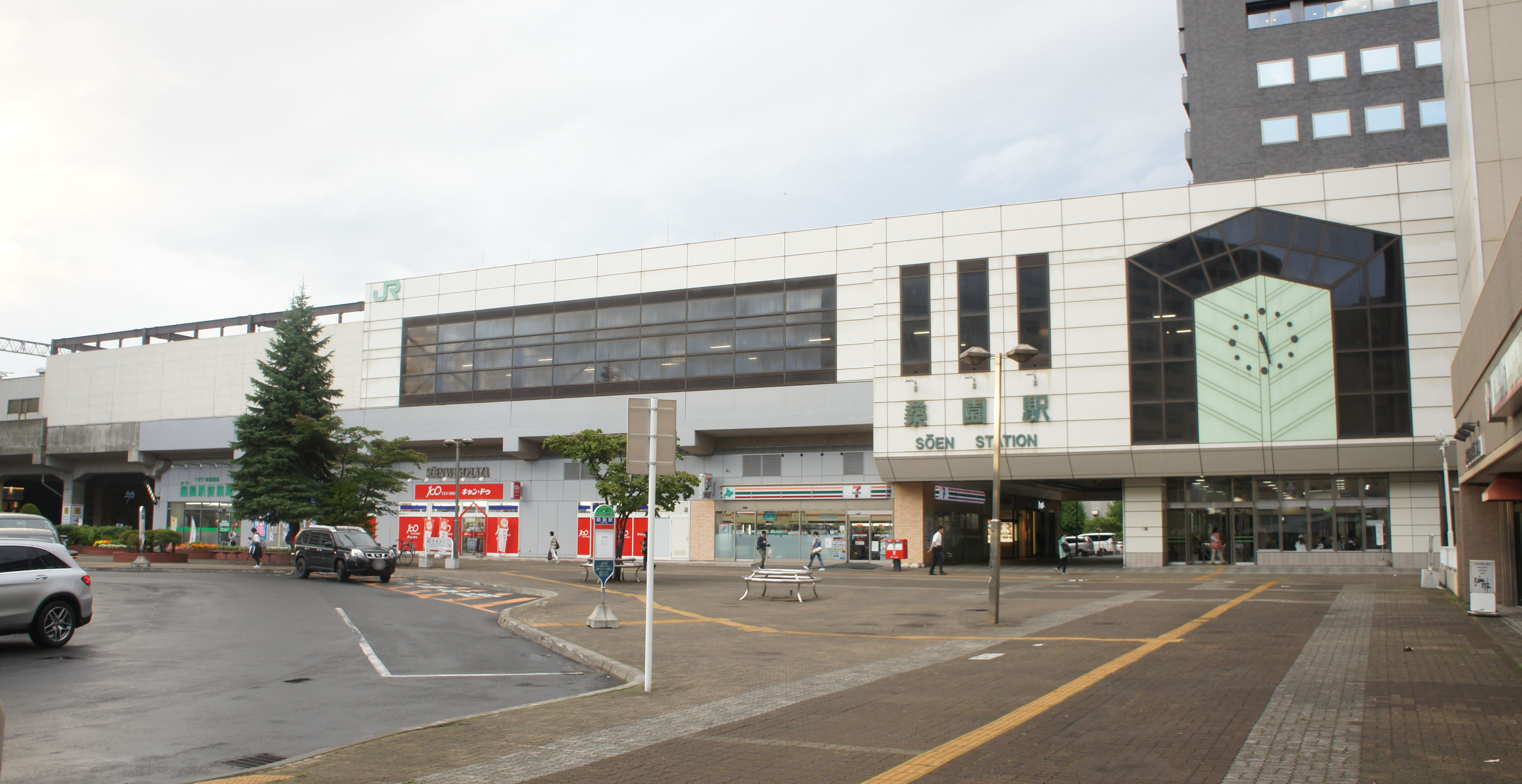
- Sōen Station, August 2018

General information
- Location: Nishi 15-chōme, Kita-11-jō, Chūō, Sapporo, Hokkaido （札幌市中央区北11条西15丁目） Japan
- Operator: JR Hokkaido
- Lines: Hakodate Main Line; Sasshō Line
- Distance: 284.7 km (176.9 mi) from Hakodate
- Platforms: 2 island platforms
- Tracks: 4
- Connections: Bus stop

Other information
- Status: Staffed
- Station code: S02

History
- Opened: 1924

Passengers
- FY2009: 8,830 daily

Services
Preceding station	JR Hokkaido	Following station
Local
Kotoni towards Hakodate	Hakodate Main Line	Sapporo towards Asahikawa
Rapid
Terminus	Sasshō Line	Hachiken towards Hokkaidō-Iryōdaigaku

Other services
Preceding station	JR Hokkaido	Following station
Rapid
Rapid Airport does not stop here
Niseko Liner does not stop here
Location

Sōen Station (桑園駅, Sōen-eki) is a railway station in Chūō-ku, Sapporo, Hokkaido, Japan, operated by the Hokkaido Railway Company (JR Hokkaido). The station is numbered S02.

== Lines ==
Sōen Station is served by the Hakodate Main Line and also the Sasshō Line (Gakuentoshi Line) from Sapporo.

== Station layout ==
The elevated station has two island platforms serving four tracks. The station has automated ticket machines, automated turnstiles which accept Kitaca, and a "Midori no Madoguchi" staffed ticket office.

=== Platforms ===
1	■ Hakodate Main Line	for Teine, Otaru
2	■ Hakodate Main Line	for Sapporo, Iwamizawa and New Chitose Airport
3	■ Gakuentoshi Line (Sasshō Line)	for Ainosato-Kyōikudai and Hokkaidō-Iryōdaigaku
4	■ Gakuentoshi Line (Sasshō Line)	for Sapporo

== Adjacent stations ==
«	Service	»
Hakodate Main Line
Kotoni (S03)	Local	Sapporo (01)
Rapid: Does not stop at this station
Semi-Rapid: Does not stop at this station
Sasshō Line
Hachiken (G03)	Local	Sapporo (01)

== History ==
The station opened on 1 June 1924.

Electric services commenced on the Sasshō Line from 1 June 2012, following electrification of the line between Sapporo and Hokkaidō-Iryōdaigaku.

== Surrounding area ==
- JR Hokkaido Head Office
- JR Freight Hokkaido branch
- Sapporo City Hospital
- Sapporo Racecourse
- Sapporo City University

== See also ==
- List of railway stations in Japan
