= List of tallest buildings in Sapporo =

Skyline of Sapporo
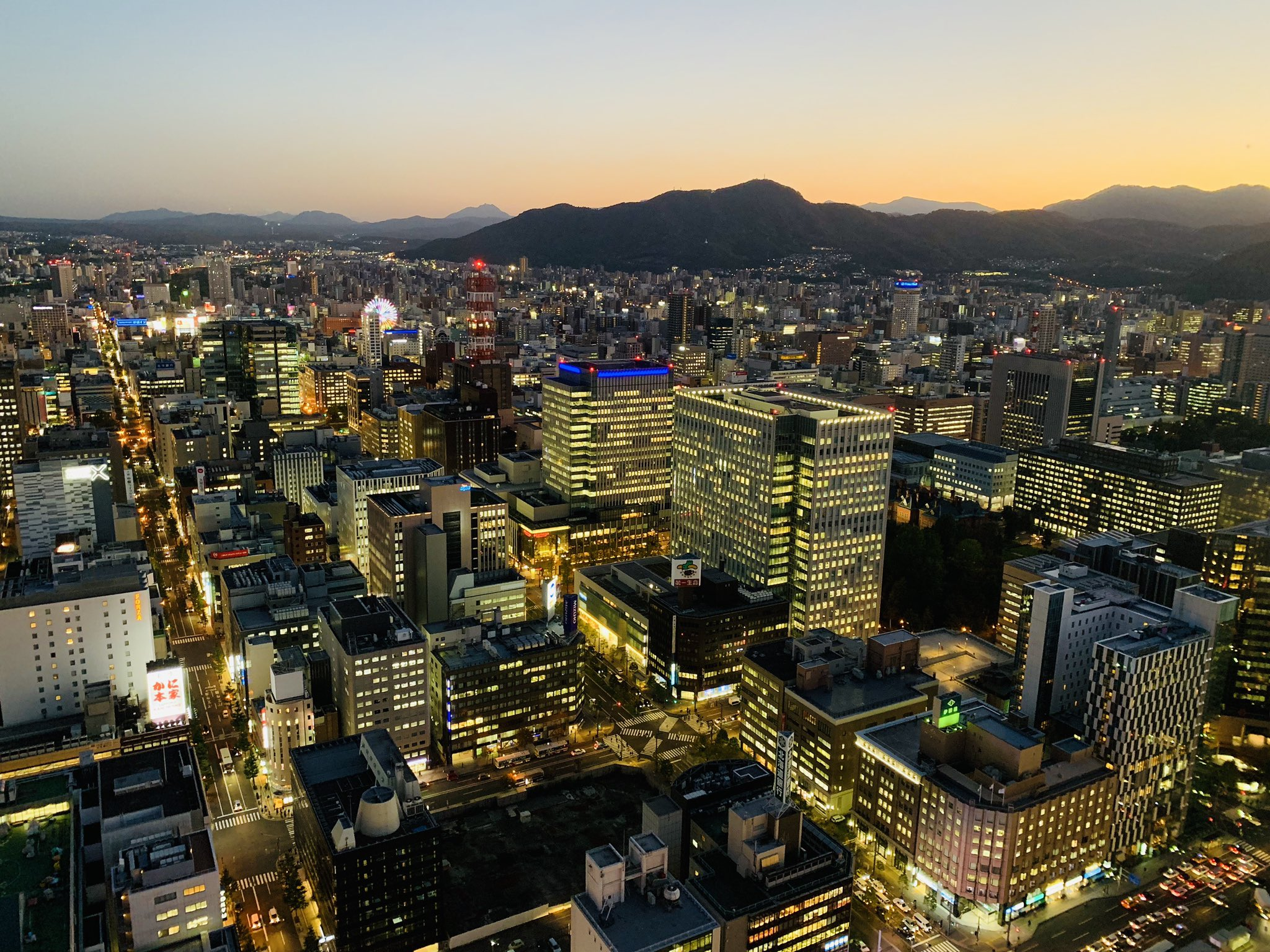
- Central Sapporo at night in 2020
- Tallest building: ONE Sapporo Station Tower (2023)
- Tallest building height: 175.2 m (575 ft)
- First 150 m+ building: Sapporo JR Tower (2003)

Number of tall buildings (2026)
- Taller than 100 m (328 ft): 23
- Taller than 150 m (492 ft): 2

Sapporo is the capital and largest city of the island of Hokkaido, and the fifth-largest city in Japan, with a population of over 1.9 million. Hokkaido is the northernmost prefecture of Japan and the largest by area. Sapporo contains the majority of tall buildings in Hokkaido. As of March 2024, Sapporo has 2 completed buildings above 150 meters (492 feet) and 22 completed buildings above 100 meters (328 feet).

The first high-rise to be built in Sapporo that reached 100 meters tall was the Sapporo Center Building in 1987. From 2000, an increasing number of high-rise buildings were built. The Sapporo JR Tower, built in 2003 at a height of 173 m (568 ft), was the tallest building in the city before the construction of the current tallest building, the 175 m (574 ft) ONE Sapporo Station Tower, in 2023. It is also the tallest building in Hokkaido. While not a habitable building, the Sapporo TV Tower, which has a height of 147.2 m (482 ft) is the third tallest structure in the city and a local landmark.

Sapporo's skyline is notable for the layout of its buildings on a grid plan, which is uncommon for cities in Japan.

== Tallest buildings ==
This list ranks completed buildings in Sapporo that stand at least 100 m (328 ft) tall, based on standard height measurement. This height includes spires and architectural details but does not include antenna masts. The "Year" column indicates the year of completion.

Was the tallest building in Sapporo upon completion

Rank	Name	Image	Height m (ft)	Floors	Year	Purpose	Notes
1	ONE Sapporo Station Tower; ONE札幌ステーションタワー		175.2 (575)	48	2023	Mixed-use	Tallest building in Sapporo since 2023. Tallest building in Sapporo completed in the 2020s.
2	Sapporo JR Tower; JRタワー		173 (568)	38	2003	Mixed-use	Mixed-use hotel and office building. Tallest building in Sapporo from 2003 to 2023. Tallest building in Sapporo completed in the 2000s.
N/A	Sapporo TV Tower さっぽろテレビ塔		147.2	5	1957	Communication; Observation	Not a habitable building. Included for comparative purposes.
3	D'Grafort Sapporo Station Tower; D'グラフォート札幌ステーションタワー		143.2 (470)	40	2007	Residential	
4	The Sapporo Tower Kotoni ザ・サッポロタワー琴似		135.6 (445)	40	2006	Residential	
5	City Tower Sapporo Odori シティタワー札幌大通		135 (443)	41	2007	Residential	
6	Premist Kotoni Sky Cross Tower プレミスト琴似スカイクロスタワー		135 (443)	40	2013	Residential	
7	Premist Sapporo Terminal Tower プレミスト札幌ターミナルタワー		128 (420)	38	2015	Residential	
8	Sapporo Sosei Square さっぽろ創世スクエア		124 (407)	28	2018	Office	
9	Lions Tower Sapporo ライオンズタワー札幌		117 (384)	28	2024	Mixed-use	Also known as moyuk SAPPORO. Mixed-use office and residential building.
10	Hotel Emisia Sapporo ホテルエミシア札幌		115.8 (380)	32	1996	Hotel	Tallest building in Sapporo from 1996 to 2003. Formerly known as the Sheraton Sapporo Hotel.
11	Sapporo Prince Hotel Tower 札幌プリンスホテルタワー		107.4 (352)	28	2004	Hotel	
12	Tiara Tower Nakajima Club ティアラタワー中島倶楽部		106 (348)	33	2005	Residential	
13	AMS New Tower Nakajima; AMSニュータワー中島		105.6 (346)	34	2006	Residential	
14	City Tower Sapporo シティタワー札幌		105.4 (346)	31	2019	Residential	
15	D'Grafort Higashi Sapporo Viento Tower; D'グラフォート東札幌ビエントタワー		104 (341)	30	2006	Residential	
16	Prime Urban Sapporo River Front プライムアーバン札幌リバーフロント		102.1 (335)	30	2008	Residential	
17	Sapporo Center Building 札幌センタービル		102 (335)	25	1987	Office	Tallest building in Sapporo from 1987 to 1996.
18	Velbyu Tower Kotoni ヴェルビュタワー琴似		101.8 (334)	30	2002	Residential	Its name is rendered into English as Vell Vue, Belleview, and Velbyu.
19	Pacific Tower Sapporo パシフィックタワー札幌		101 (331)	31	2008	Residential	
20	Governor's Official Residence Front Residence 知事公館前タワーレジデンス		100.7 (330)	31	2006	Residential	
21	Nissay Life Sapporo Building 日本生命札幌ビル		100 (328)	23	2006	Office	
22	Sapporo Mitsui JP Building 札幌三井JPビルディング		100 (328)	20	2014	Office	
23	La Tour Sapporo Ito Garden ラ・トゥール札幌伊藤ガーデン		100 (328)	30	2019	Residential	

== Tallest under construction and proposed ==
=== Under construction ===
This list ranks buildings under construction in Sapporo that are planned to be at least 100 m (328 ft) tall, based on standard height measurement. This height includes spires and architectural details but does not include antenna masts. The "Year" column indicates the year of completion.

Name	Height m (ft)	Floors	Year	Purpose	Notes
Kita 4 Nishi 3 District Redevelopment	158.4 (520)	33	2028	Mixed-use	
Urbannet Sapporo Link Tower (Hyatt Centric Sapporo)	110.9 (364)	26	2026	Mixed-use	
City Tower Sapporo Susukino シティタワー札幌すすきの	102.0 (335)	28	2025	Residential	

== Timeline of tallest buildings ==
This lists buildings that once held the title of the tallest building in Sapporo.

Name	Image	Years as tallest	Height m (ft)	Floors	Notes
Sapporo Center Building 札幌センタービル		1987–1996	102 (335)	25	
Sapporo Sheraton Hotel ホテルエミシア札幌		1996–2003	115.8 (380)	32	
Sapporo JR Tower JRタワー		2003–2023	173 (568)	38	
ONE Sapporo Station Tower ONE札幌ステーションタワー		2023–present	175.2 (575)	48	

== See also ==
- List of tallest structures in Japan

== Bibliography ==
- 荒井 宏明 (2011-02-28). "都心のなぜなに8 高層建築ベスト10". なぜなに 札幌の不思議100 (in Japanese). 北海道新聞社. ISBN 978-4-89453-583-1.
