= 日本橋 =

日本橋 may refer to:

- Nihonbashi, a business district of Chūō, Tokyo, Japan, surrounding a famous bridge of the same name
- Nipponbashi, a shopping district of Naniwa Ward, Osaka, Japan
