= Nipponbashi =

Shopping district in Osaka, Japan

Coordinates: 34°39′35″N 135°30′21″E

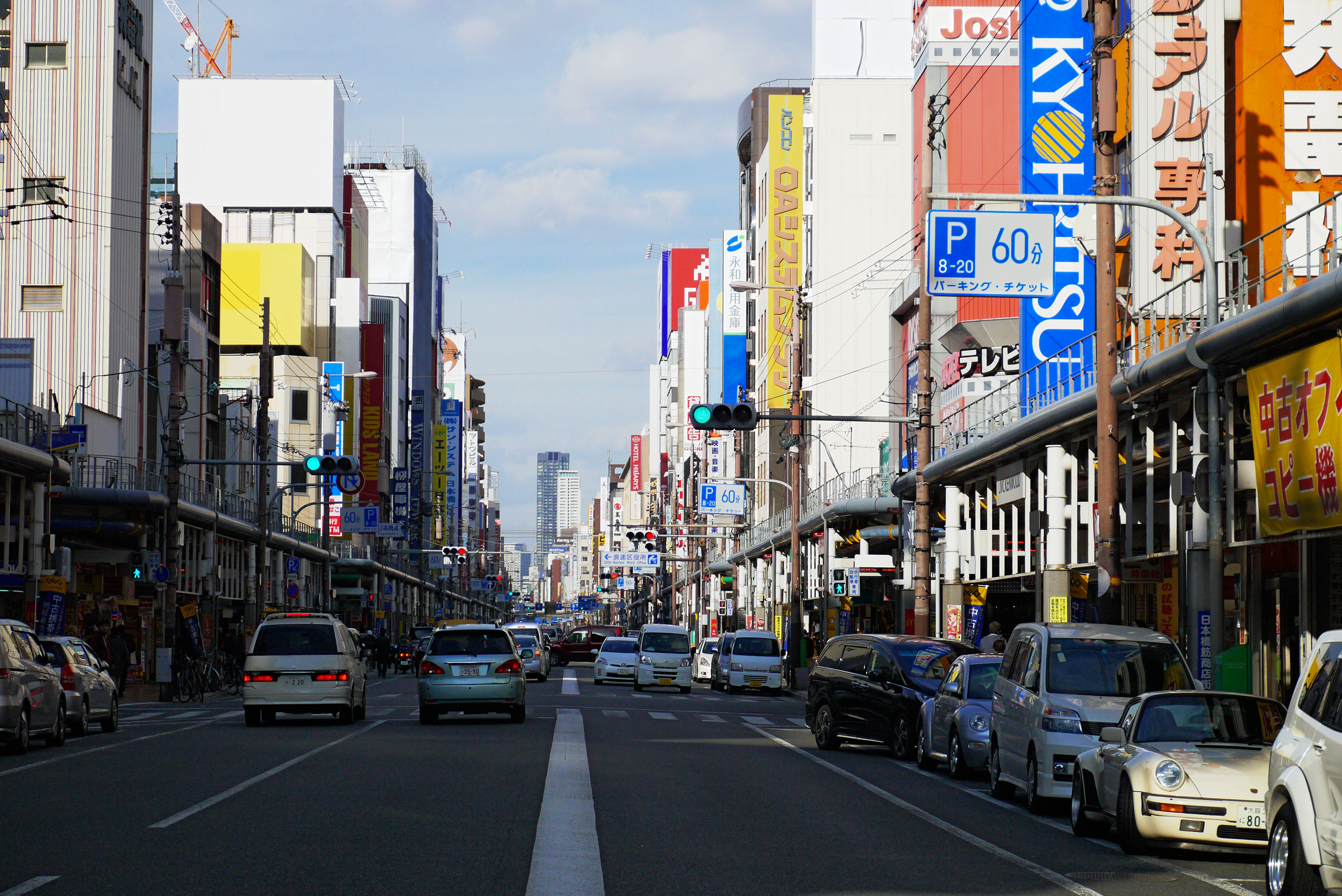
Denden Town

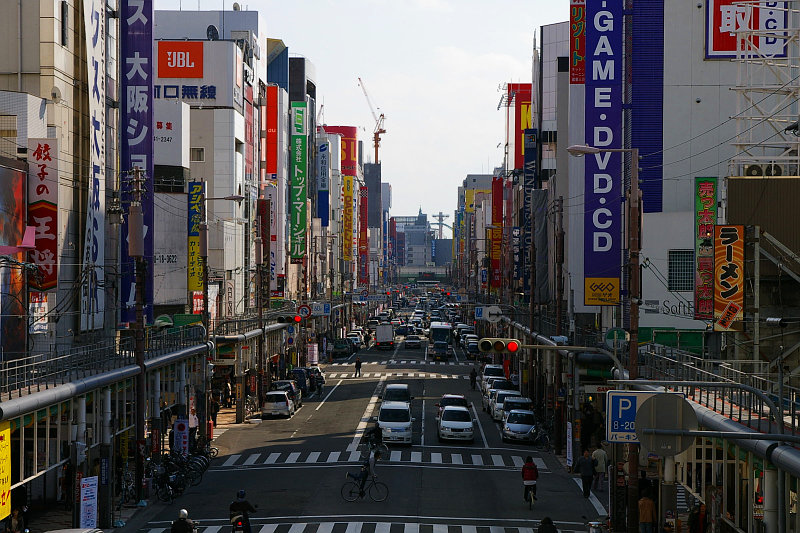
Denden Town (Nipponbashi 3 chome, Sakai-Suji)

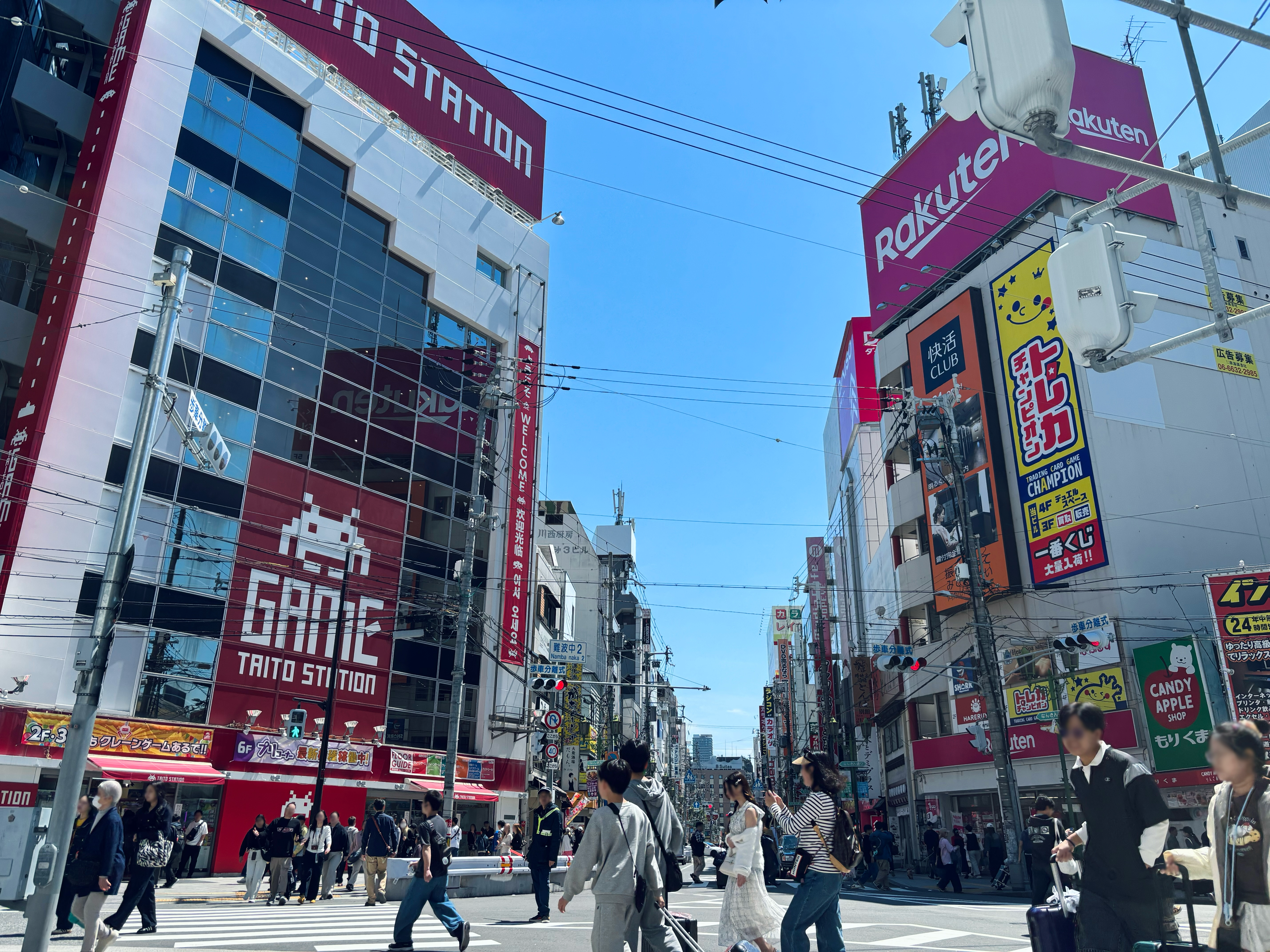
Denden Town (Nansan Street)

Nipponbashi (日本橋; Japanese pronunciation: [ɲ̟ìp̚.pó̞m̀.bä̀.ɕì, -pó̞ḿ.bä́.ɕí], (Note: The bridge's name and placename in Osaka is pronounced like this. The bridge's name and placename in Tokyo is pronounced [ɲ̟ì.hó̞ḿ.bä́.ɕí]. For the pronunciations of 日本, see Names of Japan.)) is a shopping district of Naniwa Ward, Osaka, Japan. The area is centered along Sakaisuji Avenue, extending from the Ebisu-chō Interchange of the Hanshin Expressway in the south, to Nansan-dōri (just east of Nankai Namba Station) in the north. Known colloquially as "Den-Den Town," Nipponbashi is known for its many shops which specialize in furniture, tools, and "otaku" interests such as electronics, anime, manga, and collectibles. Nipponbashi is often compared to Akihabara Electric Town, its equivalent (in terms of focus) in Tokyo.

Although written with the same kanji 日本橋 in Japanese, Nihonbashi in Chūō, Tokyo is a different place and has a different pronunciation.

== History ==
During the Edo period, this district was known as a stage (宿場町, Shukuba-machi), called Nagamachi (長町). In 1792 and 1872, the Osaka municipal government renamed this district from Nagamachi to Nipponbashi. During the Meiji and Taishō periods, many second-hand bookshops opened there. After World War II, many consumer electronics stores were opened, and it became well known as Den Den Town.

=== "Nipponbashi" name ===
"Nipponbashi" most properly refers to the bridge of the same name, which crosses over the Dōtonbori canal. However, the shopping district bearing the name of the bridge does not actually reach as far north as its namesake, though its northern areas are part of the "Nipponbashi" municipal designation (unlike Akihabara Electric Town which sits entirely apart from the origin of its name).

== Den Den Town ==
Den Den Town (でんでんタウン, Den Den taun), or Denki no machi (電気の町) is an alternate name for Nipponbashi, as it is famous for its wide variety of consumer electronics stores, and especially famous for its negotiable prices—unique to Osaka and the Kansai region. Several retailers are also tax- and duty-free.

With the opening of Yodobashi Camera in Umeda and Bic Camera in Namba, Den Den Town saw a major fall-off in furniture and home-appliance sales, but has more recently become known as a haven for anime and otaku-related shopping, analogous to Tokyo's famous electronics district Akihabara. For this reason, it is sometimes referred to as the "Akihabara of West Japan", or by the phrase "Akiba in the East, 'Ponbashi in the West".

=== Attractions ===
Besides the usual large electronics retailers such as Joshin, Sofmap, etc. Nipponbashi is also host to numerous retailers of anime, manga, and other otaku-related goods such as Mandarake, Tora no Ana, and Osaka Gundams—a two-story all-Gundam outlet. The town also features numerous maid cafés and cosplay cafés. These include small and simple maid-themed coffee shops, maid-staffed massage and beautician services, and sit-down style full service cabarets.

=== Transportation ===
Ebisucho Station of the Sakaisuji Line, as well as the Nipponbashi Station of the Sakaisuji and Sennichimae lines both lead into Den Den Town.
