= Nippon BS Broadcasting =

Japanese satellite television station

BS11
- Logo used since 2011

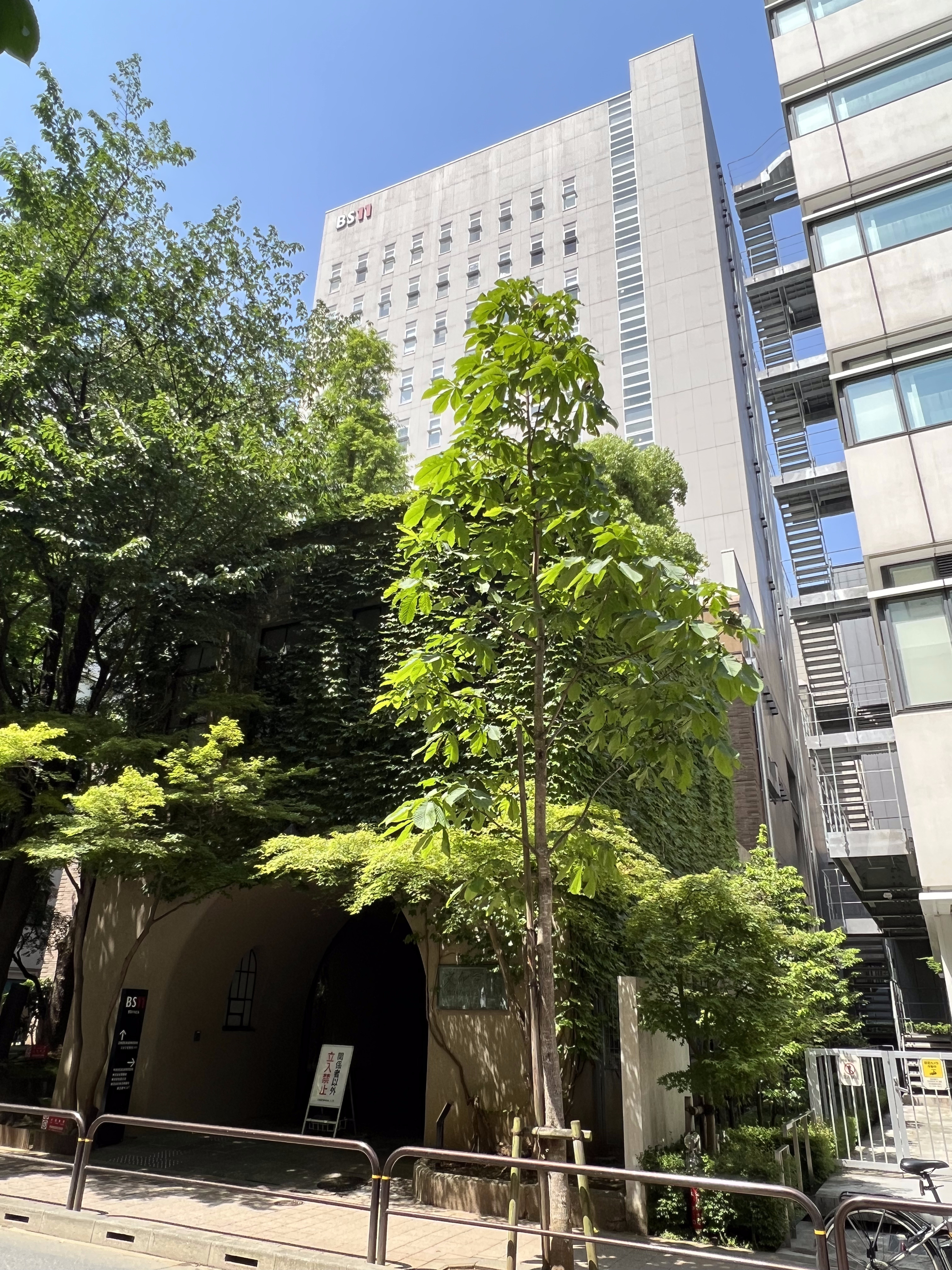
- Headquarters in Chiyoda, Tokyo
- Country: Japan
- Broadcast area: Nationwide
- Headquarters: Kanda, Chiyoda, Tokyo, Japan

Programming
- Language: Japanese
- Picture format: 1080i HDTV

Ownership
- Owner: Nippon BS Broadcasting Corp.
- Key people: Tomoyuki Oowada (CEO)

History
- Founded: August 23, 1999; 26 years ago
- Launched: December 1, 2000; 25 years ago
- Former names: BS999 (2000-2007)

Links
- Website: www.bs11.jp

Nippon BS Broadcasting Corporation (日本BS放送株式会社, Nippon Bīesu Hōsō Kabushiki Gaisha) (TYO: 9414) is a private satellite broadcasting station in Kanda, Tokyo, Japan. It is an independent television station and is a subsidiary of Bic Camera. Its channel name is BS11 (BS Eleven) and was BS11 Digital until March 31, 2011. It was founded as Nippon BS Broadcasting Project (日本BS放送企画株式会社, Nippon Bīesu Hōsō Kikaku Kabushiki Kaisha) on August 23, 1999, changed its name to Nippon BS Broadcasting on February 28, 2007, and high-definition television broadcasts commenced on December 1, 2007.

BS11 gives high priority to news programs, sports, K-drama, TV Show, anime including late night anime and 3D television programs.
