= Sofmap =

Japanese personal computer and consumer electronics retailer

Sofmap Co., Ltd.
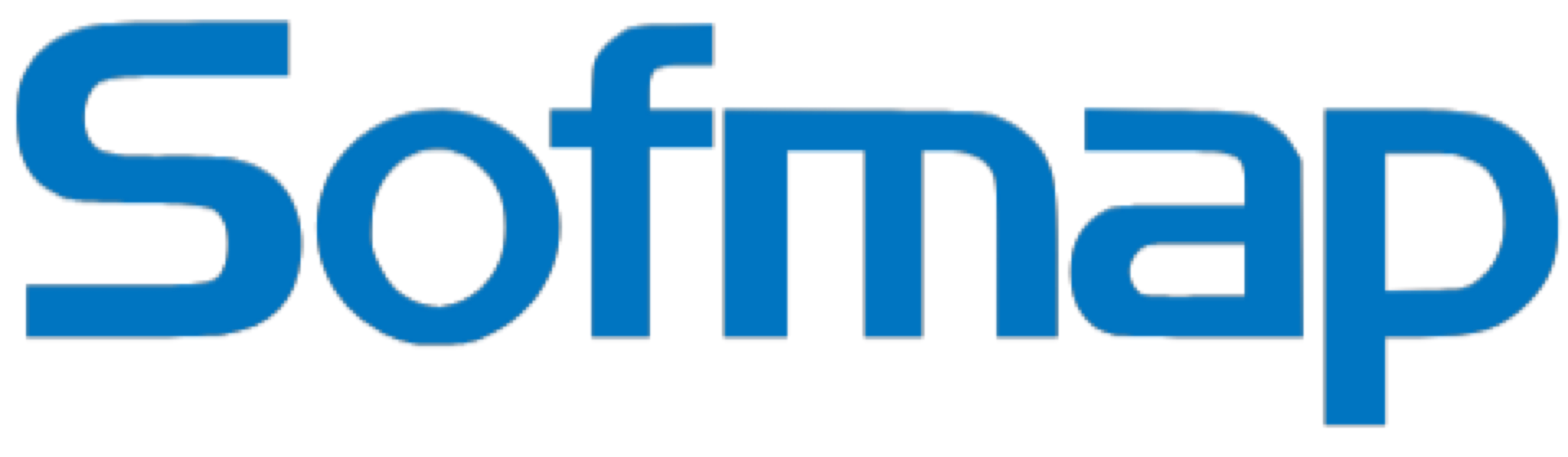
- Native name: 株式会社ソフマップ
- Romanized name: Kabushiki gaisha Sofumappu
- Company type: Subsidiary (K.K.)
- Traded as: TYO: 2690 (Delisted 26 January 26, 2010)
- Industry: Retail
- Founded: 29 April 1982
- Founder: Kei Suzuki
- Headquarters: Chiyoda, Tokyo, Japan
- Area served: Japan
- Products: Personal computers; Consumer electronics
- Parent: Bic Camera
- Subsidiaries: Animega
- Website: www.sofmap.co.jp

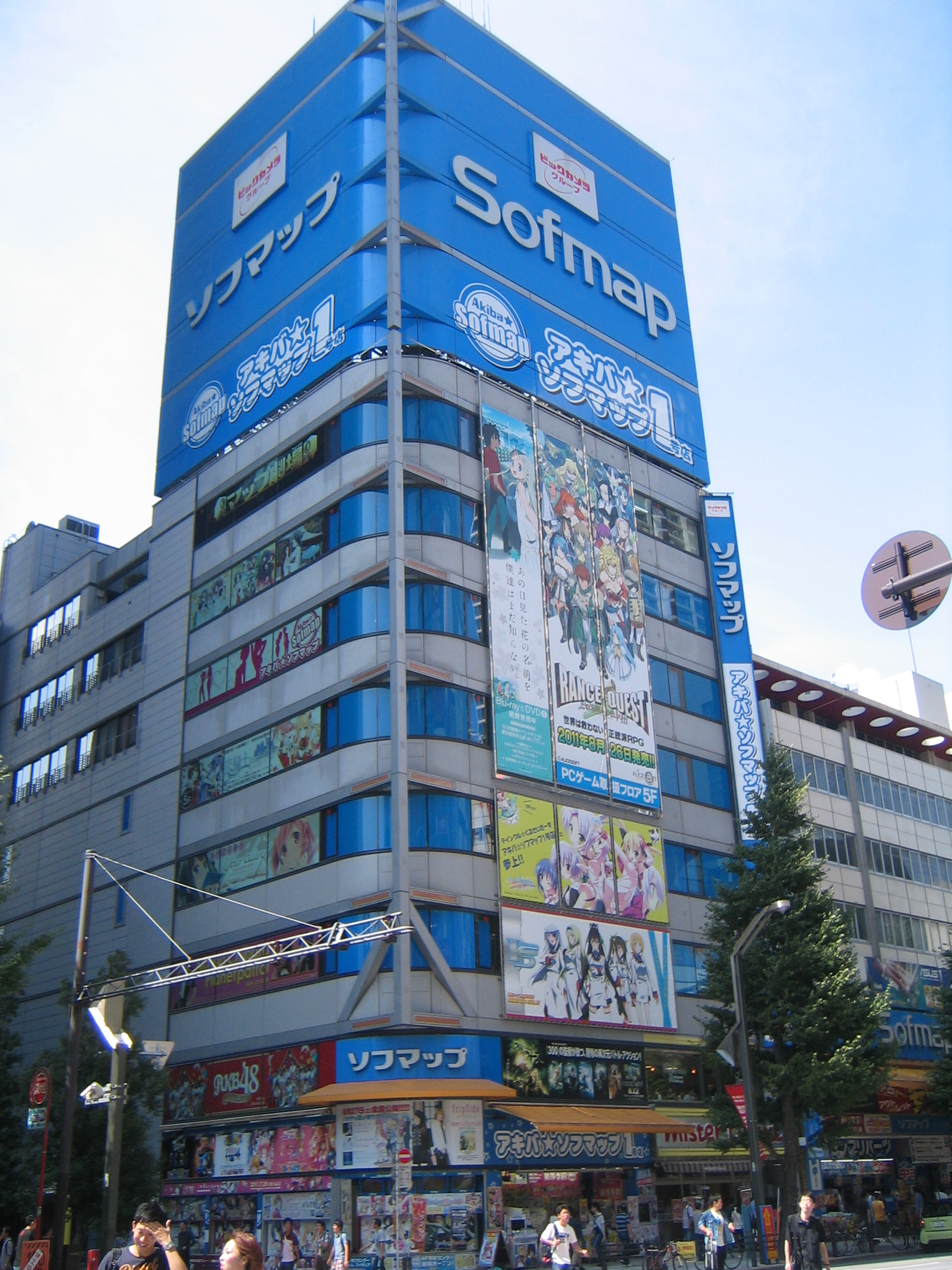
A Sofmap store in Akihabara

Sofmap Co., Ltd. (株式会社ソフマップ, Kabushiki gaisha Sofumappu) is one of the largest personal computer and consumer electronics retailers in Japan. In 2000, it was the second largest e-commerce company in the country. Bic Camera acquired a majority stake in Sofmap in 2006, and turned it into a wholly owned subsidiary in January 2010. Formerly listed on the Tokyo Stock Exchange under the code 2690, Sofmap was delisted on 26 January 2010 after the transaction was completed.

As of 2018, Sofmap has 29 stores in 21 districts, mainly in Tokyo and Akihabara.

== History ==
Sofmap was established by Kei Suzuki (鈴木慶, Suzuki Kei) in 1982 as a membership-based software rental business in Shinjuku, followed by branches in Kanda, Akihabara, and Shibuya, as well as franchise stores in Hiyoshi and Kawasaki in the Kanagawa Prefecture. In 1984, Sofmap expanded its business to new and used PC hardware, as well as Nintendo Family Computer and PC software sales. A year later, the software rental business was discontinued after it was declared illegal by the Japanese government.

At the beginning of their hardware sales, Sofmap specialized in "box sales", where it set up shops at small-sized commercial buildings in Akihabara and Osaka/Nipponbashi and sold computers at low prices. In 1986, the company published a free publication titled Sofmap Times (ソフマップタイムズ, Sofumappu Taimuzu), which listed computer products and prices. To differentiate themselves from other PC stores, Sofmap introduced their warranty system: five years for new computers and three years for used computers.

In anticipation of the PC boom that started with the release of Windows 95, Sofmap increased its floor space and focused on display sales for new PC users. However, during the mid-1990s, sales declined due to a combination of factors such as falling prices of personal computers, reduced distribution and profitability due to shortened product cycles of used products, and sluggish sales of home video games. In 1997, amidst rumors of the company filing for bankruptcy, Sofmap was purchased by Marubeni.

In 2000, Suzuki retired and was replaced by Yoshiro Kajitani (柿谷義郎, Kajitani Yoshirō). The sofmap.com website was also established that year.

In 2005, Marubeni partially transferred its shares of Sofmap to Bic Camera, with Bic owning 61.56% of Sofmap by 2006. On January 29, 2010, Sofmap became a wholly owned subsidiary of Bic Camera. On March 1, 2012, the retail division was split and Sofmap Co., Ltd. was established, and the remaining store real estate management division was merged into Bic Camera. On June 5, 2017, Sofmap's main Akihabara branch was converted into a Bic Camera branch while the rest of the Akihabara branches were rebranded as Akiba BicMap (AKIBAビックマップ, Akiba Bikku Mappu).

On October 31, 2019, Sofmap acquired anime shop Animega (アニメガ) from Bunkyodo Group Holdings.

== Stores ==
Sofmap has stores in the following locations:

Tokyo

- Akihabara

- Akihabara Station Square Hall (former Sato Musen and Yamada Denki LAB1 store)
- Akiba Digital Building
- Animega x Sofmap Amusement Building

- Ikebukuro

- Bic Camera Outlet x Sofmap Ikebukuro East Exit
- Sofmap Re Collection Ikebukuro

- Sofmap Re Collection Shimbashi
- Sofmap Re Collection Nakano Broadway
- Shinjuku
- Tachikawa
- Bic Camera x Sofmap Machida

Kanagawa

- Yokohama

- Bic Camera Outlet x Sofmap Vivre Shop

Saitama Prefecture

- Kawagoe
- Ōmiya

Miyagi Prefecture

- Sendai

- Sofmap x Animega Sendai Station Square

Shizuoka Prefecture

- Shizuoka

Aichi Prefecture

- Nagoya

- Sofmap x Animega Nagoya Station West

Osaka

- Namba

- Animega x Sofmap
- Bic Camera Outlet x Sofmap
- Sofmap Re Collection Namba

Hyōgo Prefecture

- Sofmap x Kojima Kobe Harborland

Hiroshima Prefecture

- Sofmap Re Collection Hiroshima Station Square

Okayama Prefecture

- Okayama Station

Kyushu

- Fukuoka

- Sofmap x Animega Tenjin
