= Sapporo JR Tower =

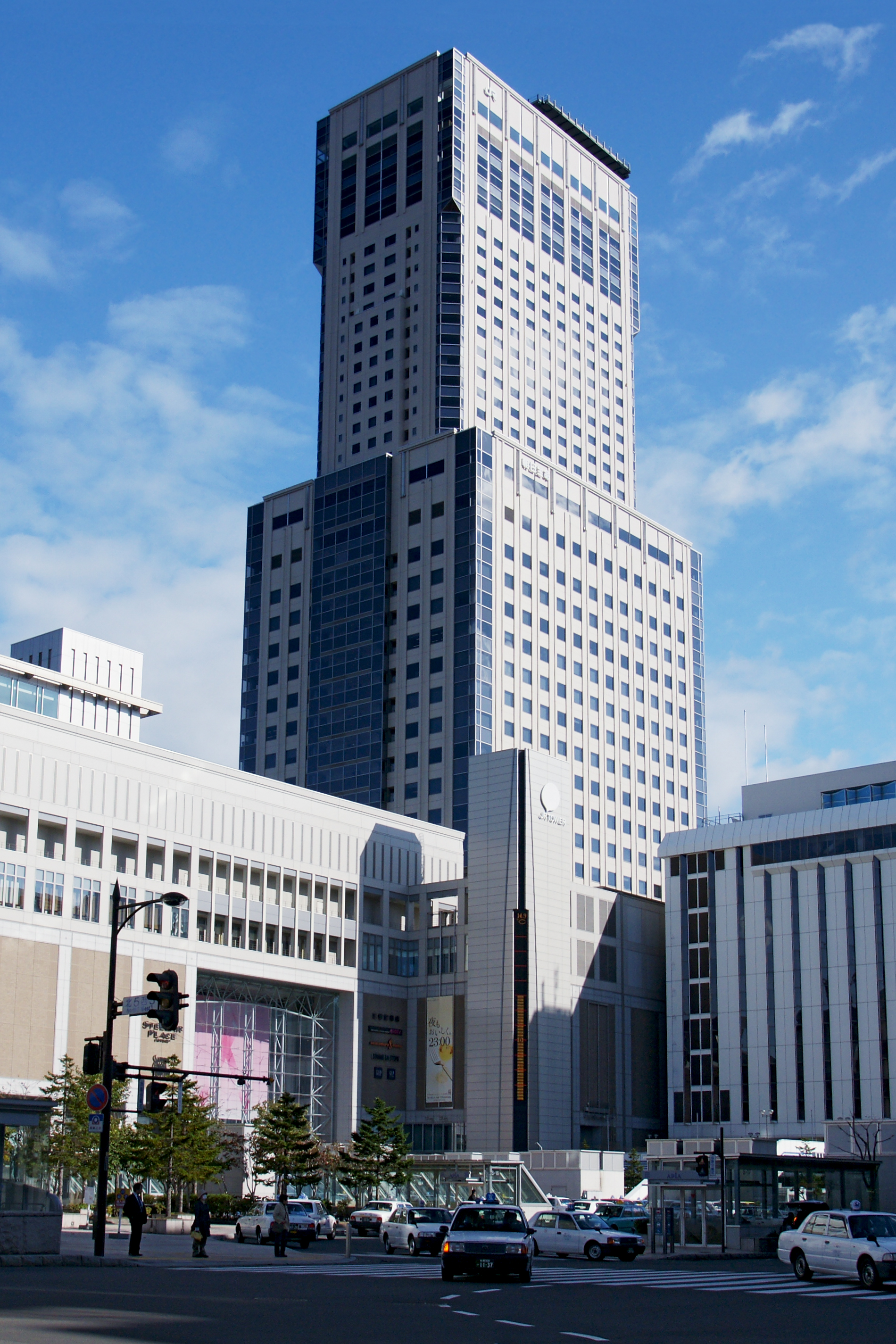
- Location: Chuo-ku, Sapporo, Hokkaidō, Japan
- Coordinates: 43°04′05″N 141°21′09″E
- Opened: March 6, 2003
- Manager: Sapporo-Eki Minamiguchi Kaihatsu Co. Ltd.
- Owner: Sapporo-Eki Minamiguchi Kaihatsu Co. Ltd.
- Floor area: 274,459 m² (in total); 90,627 m² (Tower section)
- Floors: 38 (Tower section)
- Website: www.jr-tower.com (Japanese)

Sapporo JR Tower (Japanese: JRタワー) is a skyscraper, shopping mall and office complex in Sapporo, Hokkaidō, Japan. The tower is located above JR Sapporo Station South entrance, and the height of the tower is 173 m (568 ft) with 38 stories. Officially, Sapporo JR Tower includes not only the Tower itself, but also the Sapporo Stellar Place, the Daimaru Sapporo branch store, the Sapporo Cinema Frontier, the JR Tower Hotel Nikko Sapporo, office complex, and other sections neighboring JR Sapporo Station. It also houses the parking lot, observation deck, and heliport.

Sapporo JR Tower was officially opened on March 6, 2003 by the Sapporo-Eki Minamiguchi Kaihatsu Co. Ltd., (札幌駅南口開発株式会社, Sapporo Station South Entrance Development in English), which was later renamed to the Sapporo-Eki Sogo Kaihatsu Co., Ltd. (札幌駅総合開発株式会社, Sapporo Station General Development) in 2005.

== History ==
In the planning stage step, the name of building complex was "Sapporo-Eki Minamiguchi Sougou Kaihatsu Building (Sapporo Station South Entrance General Development Building)". In November 2000, the name was formally changed to the "JR Tower". The completion ceremony was held in February 2003, and JR Tower opened to the public on March 6, 2003.

On October 1, 2005, the Sapporo-Eki Minamiguchi Kaihatsu Co. Ltd., a company which managed JR Tower, renamed to the Sapporo-Eki Sogo Kaihatsu Co., Ltd. after the merger of four companies. JR Tower Square Card, a credit card with loyalty program, has issued since March 2006.

== Overview ==
Sapporo JR Tower is separated in three sections: West, Center, and East. In the West section, is where Daimaru Sapporo branch store, a nine-storey building, is located. There are four floors in the basement, and three of them are used as the parking lot.

The Center section also has nine floors and one floor in the basement, and is a complex building comprising the Sapporo Stellar Place, a shopping mall, and the Sapporo Cinema Frontier, a movie theater complex. Eki-Sta, a television studio, is located in the ground floor of the Center section.

The East section has the 38-storey Tower building. From the basement to the 6th floor, the Sapporo Stellar Place is located as the Center section, and from the 7th floor to the 20th floor, the JR Tower Office Plaza Sapporo, an office complex, is located. From the 22nd floor to the 36th floor are used as hotel rooms of the JR Tower Hotel Nikko Sapporo, and at the 38th floor, the Tower Three Eight, an observation deck, is located. Elevators which take directly to the 38th floor are served at 6th floor, and visitors are required to buy tickets. In the male bathroom in the northeast corner of the 38th floor, urinals are lined adjacent to large windows so that people can survey the view of entire Sapporo City while they are urinating. The underpass of the East section connects to the Sapporo ESTA, a commercial building complex neighboring to the JR Tower.
