= Sapporo Esta =

Closed commercial building in Sapporo, Japan

Coordinates: 43°04′03″N 141°21′10″E

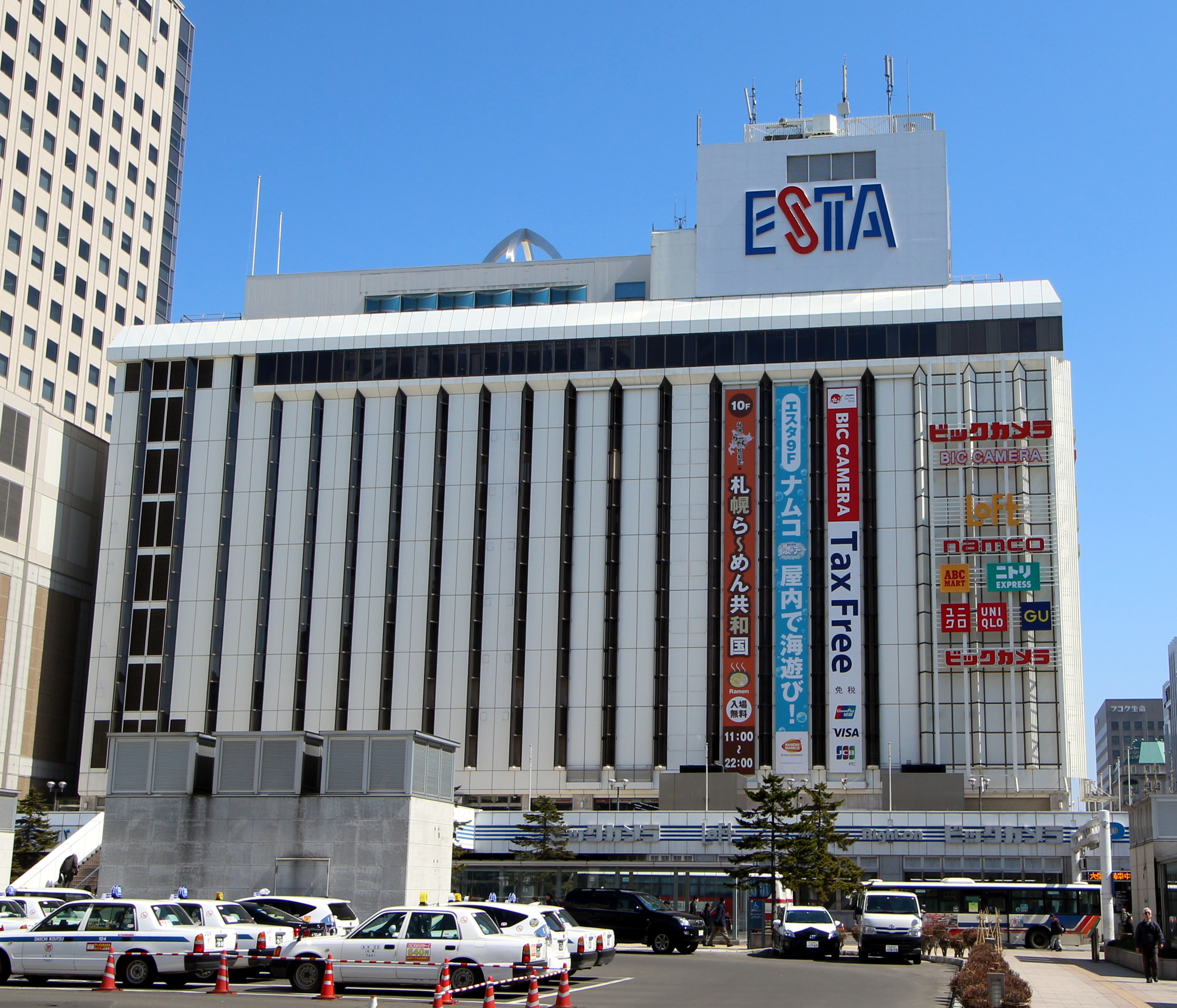
Sapporo Esta

Sapporo Esta (札幌エスタ, Sapporo Esuta) was a commercial building in the Sapporo Station complex in Chūō-ku, Sapporo, Hokkaido, Japan.

== Overview ==
The name "Esta" is derived from the word "Estación", which means "station" and "season" in Spanish. The building was opened as a department store, Sapporo Sogo, in 1978. Sogo closed the branch in 2000, and the building was unused except for the first and 10th floors.

Bic Camera opened a Sapporo branch store from the first to sixth floor in 2001, and some other companies such as Uniqlo also opened branches in the building. In 2004, the Sapporo Rāmen Republic (札幌ら～めん共和国, Sapporo Rāmen Kyōwakoku), a food amusement park based on the theme of ramen, opened on the 10th floor of the building.

On 31 August 2023, Sapporo Esta was closed as part of Sapporo Station's redevelopment program for the upcoming Hokkaido Shinkansen extension, with Bic Camera and Uniqlo relocating to the Tokyu Department Store across the street.
