= Bic Camera =

Japanese consumer electronics retailer

Bic Camera, Inc.

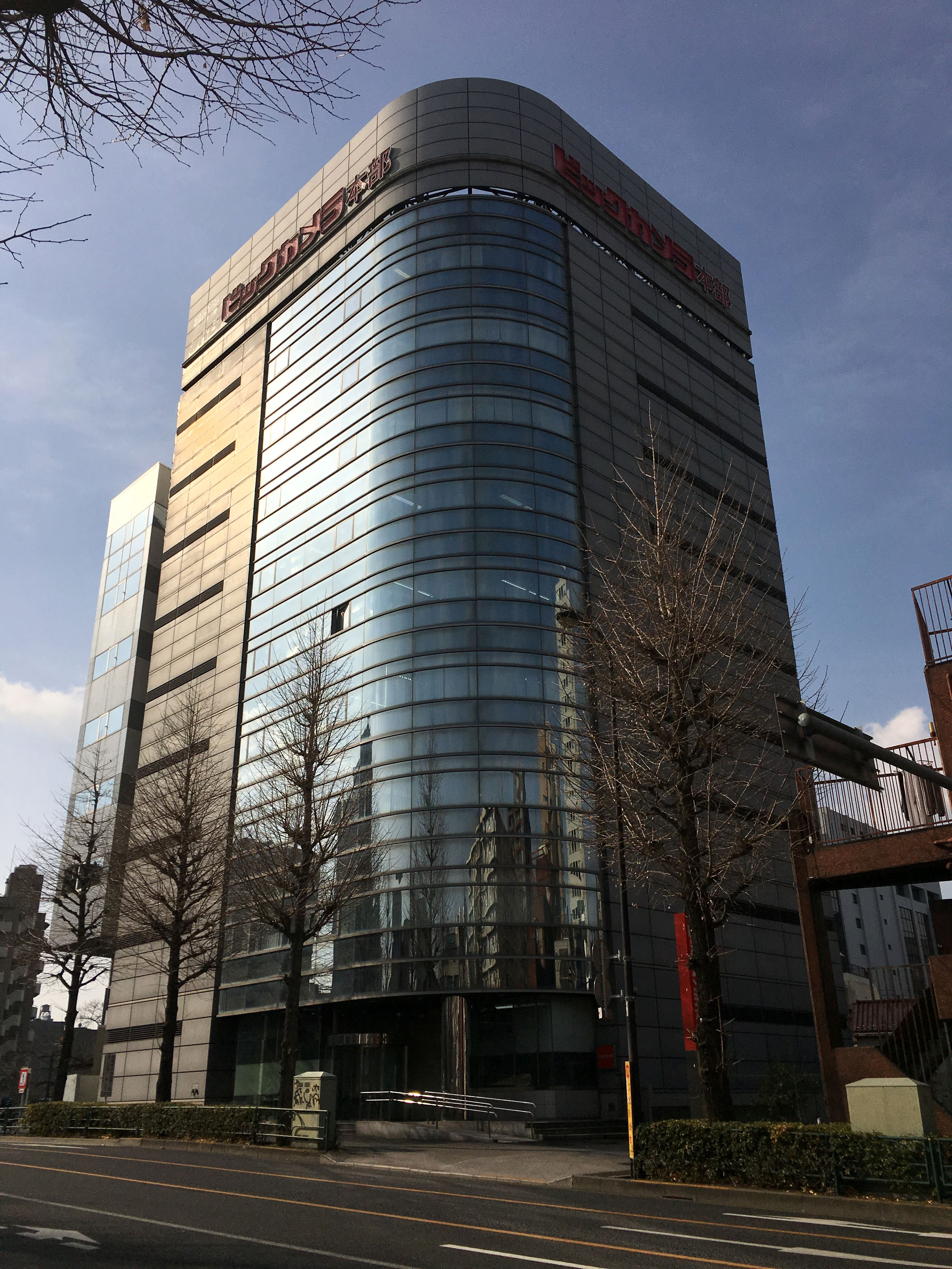
- Bic Camera headquarters in Toshima
- Native name: 株式会社ビックカメラ
- Romanized name: Kabushiki gaisha Bikku Kamera
- Type: Public (K.K.)
- Traded as: TYO: 3048
- Industry: Retail
- Founded: 1968; 58 years ago
- Founder: Ryuji Arai
- Headquarters: Toshima, Tokyo, Japan
- Number of locations: 45
- Area served: Japan
- Products: Consumer electronics; Home appliances; Video games and consoles; Toys
- Subsidiaries: Sofmap Co., Ltd.; Kojima Co., Ltd.; Nippon BS Broadcasting Corp.
- Website: www.biccamera.com

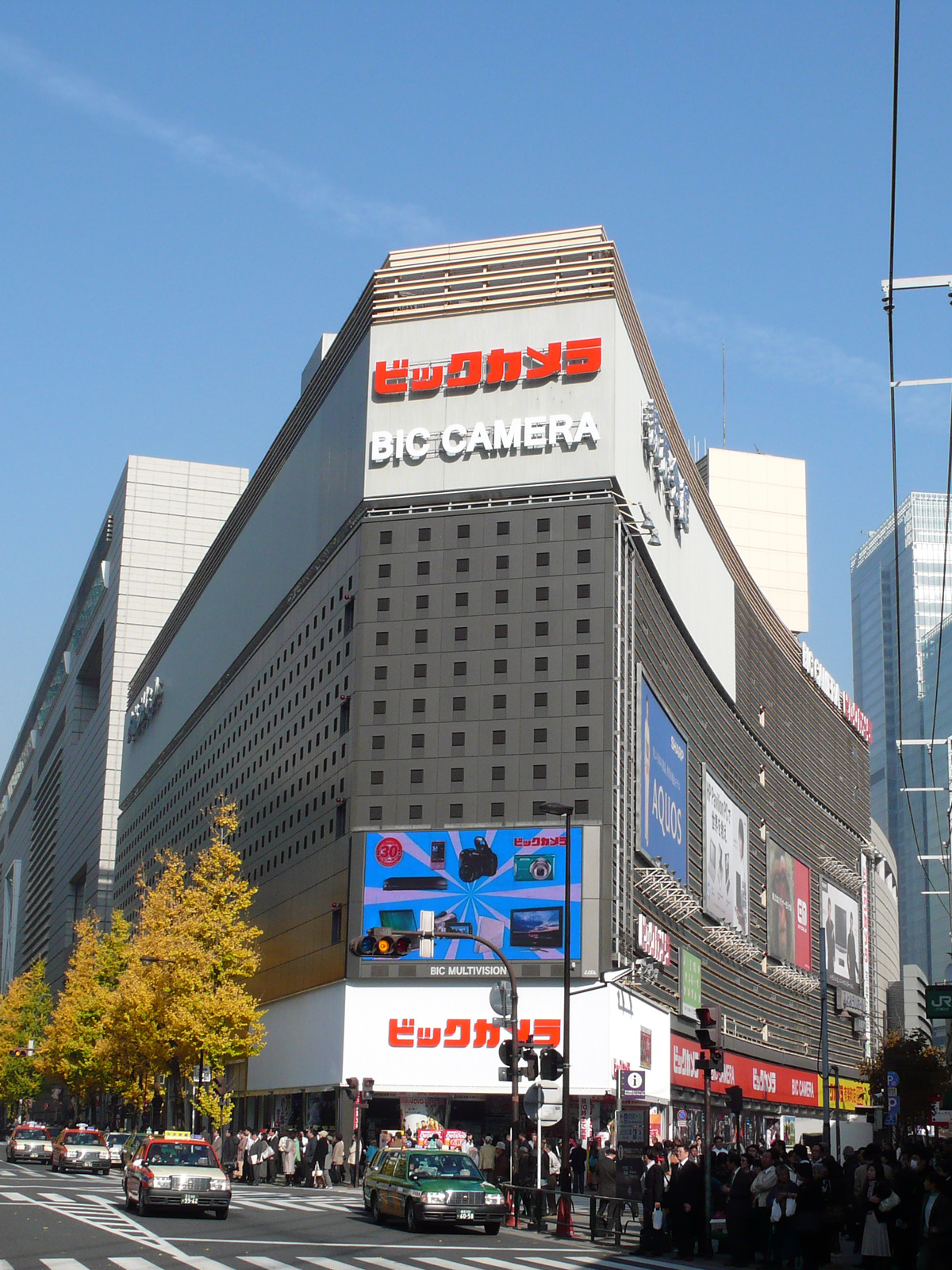
Yūrakuchō Store, in Tokyo

Bic Camera, Inc. (株式会社ビックカメラ, Kabushiki gaisha Bikku Kamera) is a consumer electronics retailer chain in Japan. Currently, it has 45 stores in 17 prefectures. Bic Camera has a 50% ownership of former rival store Kojima with 143 stores and full ownership of computer store chain Sofmap with 24 stores.

As of 2023, Bic Camera is the second largest electronics and home appliance retailer, behind Yamada Denki.

== History ==
In 1968, Ryuji Arai (新井隆司, Arai Ryuji) founded Takasaki DP Center Co., Ltd. (株式会社高崎DPセンター, Kabushiki gaisha Takasaki DP Sentā) in Takasaki, Gunma Prefecture. Four years later, the camera sales department was separated from the company and renamed Bic Color Co., Ltd. (株式会社ビックカラー, Kabushiki gaisha Bikku Karā). In 1978, Bic Color was renamed Bic Camera, with their first store opening in Ikebukuro, Tokyo. Originally specializing in selling cameras at discount prices, Bic Camera expanded to selling home appliances, personal computers, alcoholic beverages, golf equipment, bedding, luxury brand products, bicycles, and toys.

In 1994, Bic Camera spun-off its PC section to Bic Personal Computer Hall (株式会社ビックパソコン館設立, Kabushiki gaisha Bikku Pasokon-kan). Following a decline in PC sales, this subsidiary was absorbed back into the company in 2000. In 1995, Bic Camera displayed banners protesting France's nuclear weapons testing in the South Pacific. Nippon BS Broadcasting Corp. was established in 1999, with Bic Camera as its majority shareholder.

As part of its expansion, Bic Camera purchased Sogo's Yūrakuchō building in 2001. Throughout the 2000s, Bic Camera opened locations connected to JR stations across the country. In 2005, Bic Camera moved its headquarters from Nishi-Ikebukuro to Takada. A year later, the company purchased Sofmap in February and had itself listed in the JASDAQ Securities Exchange on August 10. In September, Bic Camera purchased a 3.2% stake in Tokyo Broadcasting System. On October 5, 2007, Bic Camera acquired a 9.33% share of rival Best Denki and increased its stake to 14.95%. On June 10, 2008, the company was listed on the Tokyo Stock Exchange and had itself delisted from JASDAQ on August 29. In 2009, Bic Camera was fined US$1.3 million by the TSE for falsifying its earnings after its shares lost half its value early that year. As a result, Arai stepped down as chairman and the company was delisted from the TSE. Sofmap was delisted on January 26, 2010 after becoming a wholly owned subsidiary of Bic Camera. In June 2010, Bic Camera absorbed rival Sakuraya.

On June 26, 2012, Bic Camera purchased 50% of rival store chain Kojima (株式会社コジマ, Kabushiki gaisha Kojima). As a result of the Kojima acquisition, Best Denki split from Bic Camera and was fully acquired by Yamada Denki on July 13. On September 1, Arai was reinstated as chairman. On September 27, Bic Camera signed a partnership with clothing giant Uniqlo to convert the Shinjuku East Store to BICQLO (ビックロ, Bikkuro). The partnership ended on June 19, 2022 and the store reverted into a Bic Camera branch the next day.

In April 2016, Bic Camera opened its first Air Bic Camera (エア ビックカメラ, Ea Bikku Kamera) branch at Haneda Airport. Air Bic Camera also has locations at Narita International Airport, Chubu Centrair International Airport, and Naha Airport, as well as two branches in Odaiba. On December 19, Bic Camera partnered with Rakuten to launch Rakuten Bic (楽天ビック, Rakuten Bikku). In 2018, Bic Camera reported record profits and a 50% increase in shares as a result of a rise in Chinese tourists and the store chain's acceptance of Alipay and WeChat.

On February 7, 2020, Bic Camera opened its Nihonbashi Kaden branch in partnership with Mitsukoshi.

On March 5, 2021, Bic Camera opened its Kumamoto branch next to Kumamoto Station. In June 2021, the company was ranked 132nd on the Global Powers of Retailing's Top 250 list. In 2022, new branches were opened in Takatsuki and Chiba. In addition, Bic Camera partnered with the JR East to have its own section on the "JRE Mall" online store.

On May 7, 2023, Bic Camera closed its Kyoto branch, with its assets transferred to the Takatsuki branch.

== Stores ==
Bic Camera has stores in the following locations:

Tokyo

- Ikebukuro

- Main store
- Camera/PC building
- West Exit
- Bic Camera Outlet x Sofmap Ikebukuro East Exit
- Photo studio

- Shinjuku

- West Exit (Odakyu HALC)
- East Exit (formerly Bicqlo; former Sakuraya store)
- East Exit Station Square

- Yūrakuchō (former Sogo department store)
- Shibuya

- East store
- Hachikoguchi

- Akihabara (former Sofmap store)
- Nihonbashi (partnered with Mitsukoshi)
- Akasaka
- Haneda Airport (Air Bic Camera)
- Odaiba (Air Bic Camera at DiverCity Tokyo Plaza and Aqua City)
- Tokyo Skytree (Air Bic Camera)
- Tachikawa
- Chōfu
- Hachiōji (CELEO)
- Machida (Bic Camera x Sofmap)

Kanagawa

- Yokohama

- West store
- Shin-Yokohama
- Vivre Shop (Bic Camera Outlet x Sofmap)

- Kawasaki
- Fujisawa
- Sagamihara (former Sakuraya store)

Chiba Prefecture

- Chiba
- Kashiwa
- Funabashi (former Sakuraya store)
- Narita International Airport (Air Bic Camera)

Saitama Prefecture

- Ōmiya
- Tokorozawa

Gunma Prefecture

- Takasaki

Ibaraki Prefecture

- Mito

Hokkaido

- Sapporo (partnered with Tokyu Department Store)

Niigata Prefecture

- Niigata (partnered with CoCoLo)

Nagano Prefecture

- Matsumoto (partnered with Aeon Mall)

Shizuoka Prefecture

- Hamamatsu

Aichi Prefecture

- Nagoya

- Nagoya Station West store
- Nagoya Station JR Gate Tower

- Tōgō
- Chubu Centrair International Airport (Air Bic Camera)

Osaka

- Namba

- Main store
- Bic Camera Outlet x Sofmap

- Abeno
- Yao

- Ario Yao
- Bic Camera Toys

- Takatsuki

Okayama Prefecture

- Okayama

Hiroshima Prefecture

- Hiroshima

Kyushu

- Fukuoka

- Tenjin Store #1
- Tenjin Store #2

- Kumamoto
- Kagoshima

Okinawa

- Naha Airport (Air Bic Camera)

Former stores

- Ikebukuro North Exit (closed 2002)
- Takasaki West Exit (closed 2011)
- Yūrakuchō Store Annex (closed 2011; now a Loft store)
- Former Shinjuku East Exit (closed 2012; now a Cocokara Fine drug store)
- Former Ikebukuro East Exit (closed 2021; now a GIGO branch)
- Funabashi Tōbu (closed 2022)
- Shijō Kawaramachi Select, Kyoto (closed 2022)
- Roppongi Station Select, Tokyo (Bic Camera Select; closed 2022)
- Harajuku Select, Tokyo (Bic Camera Select; closed 2022)
- Machida, Tokyo (Tokyo Odakyu department store; closed 2022)
- Kyōto Station (closed 2023)
- Seiseki-sakuragaoka Station (closed 2023)
- Sapporo Esta (closed 2023; moved to Tokyu Department Store)
- Ikebukuro Select (closed 2024; now a Sofmap store)
- Ito-Yokado Tama Plaza (closed 2025)
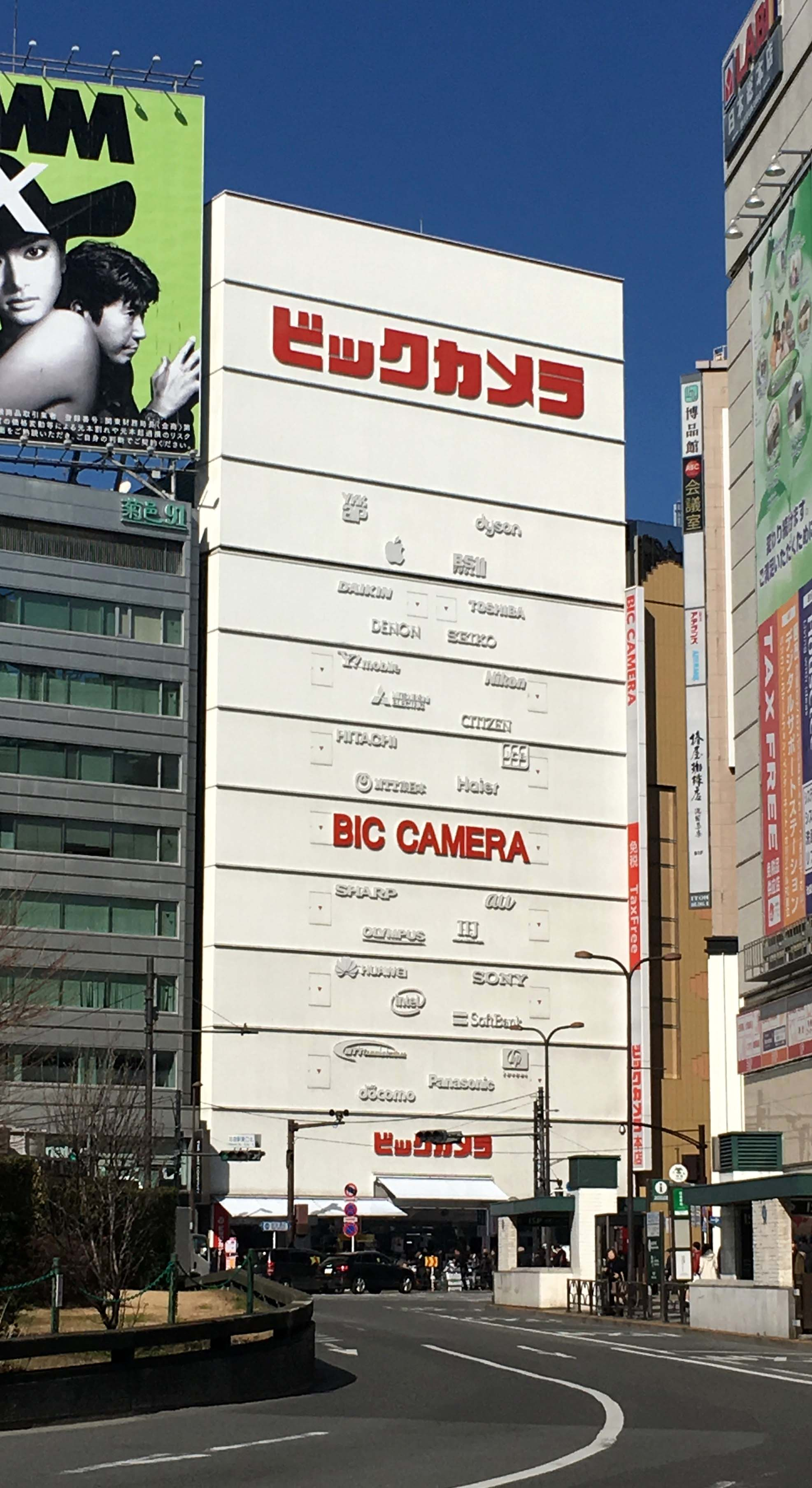
Bic Camera Ikebukuro main store

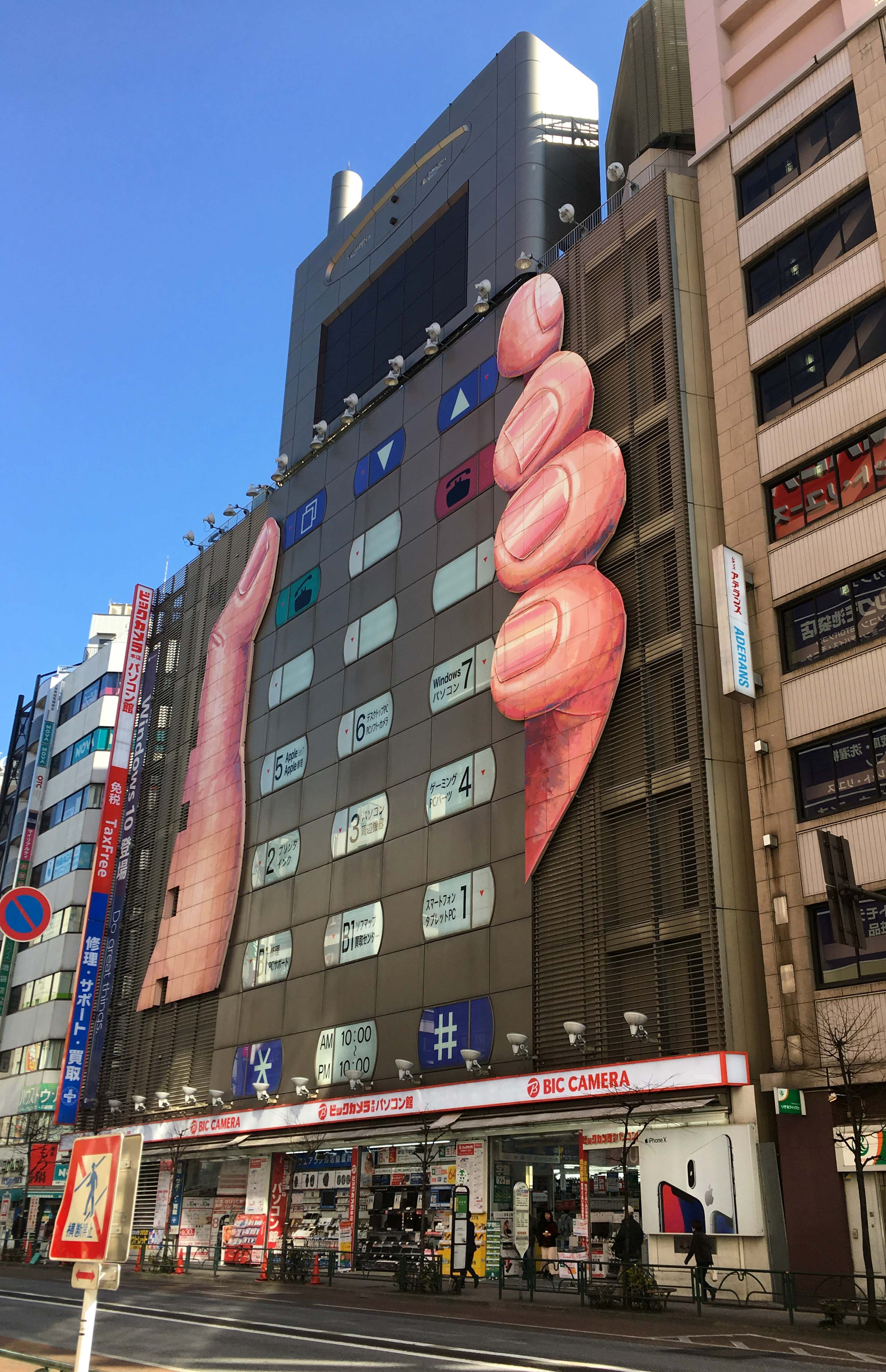
Bic Camera Ikebukuro Camera/PC building

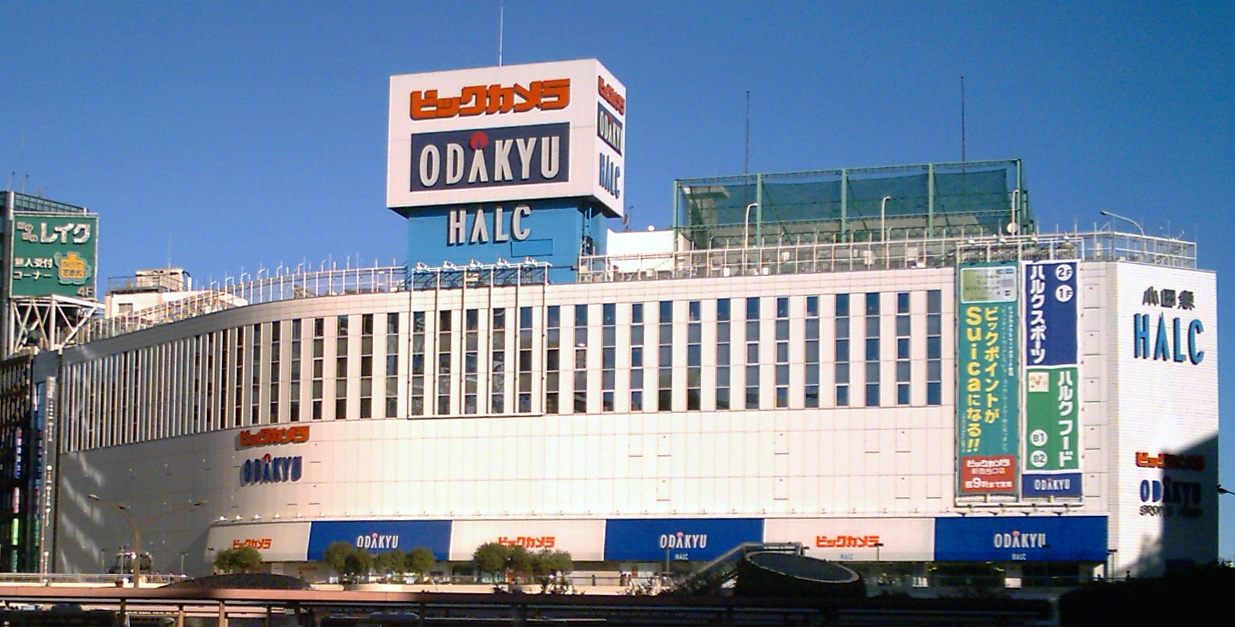
Bic Camera Shinjuku West Odakyu HALC

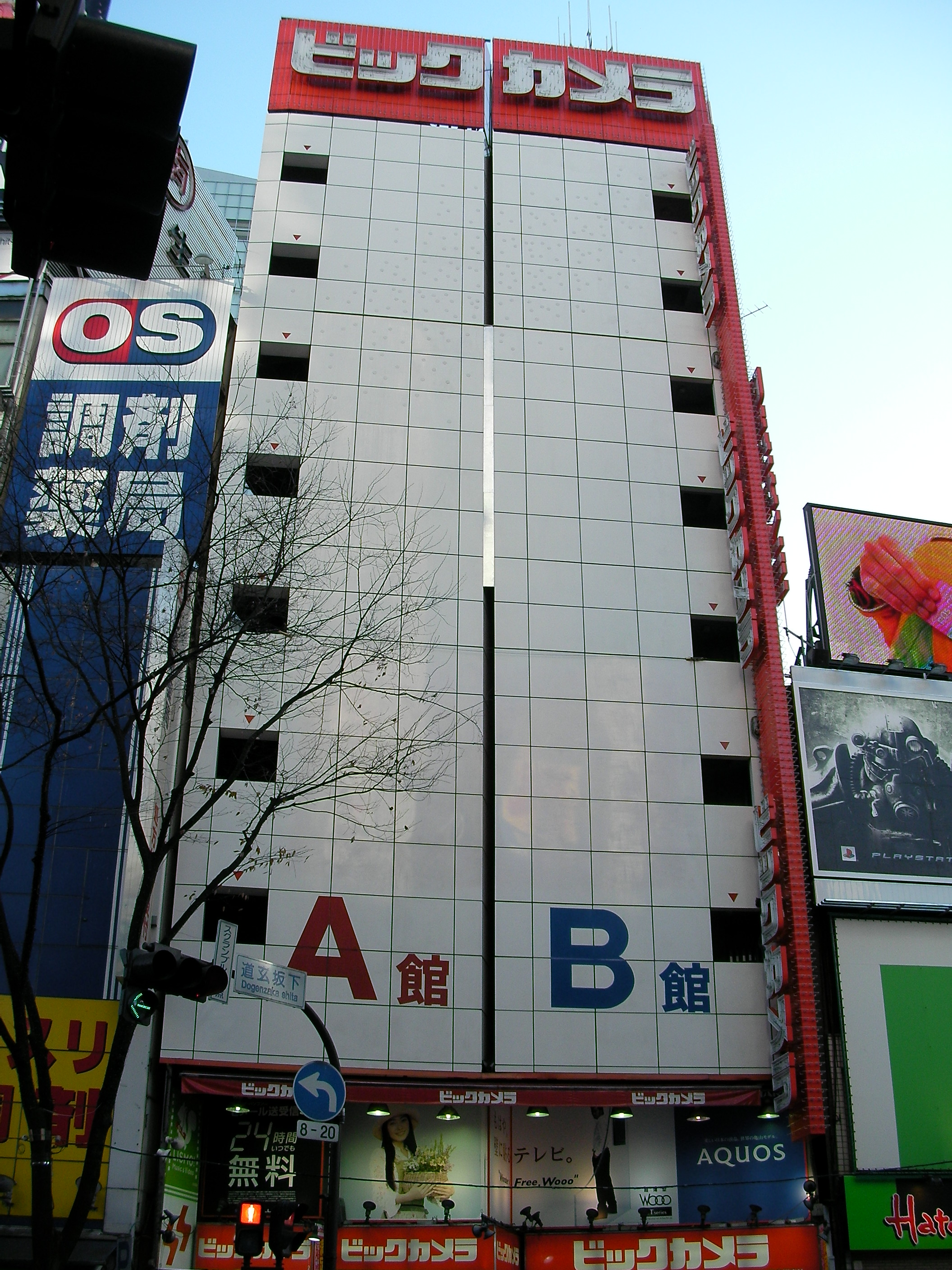
Bic Camera Shibuya East store

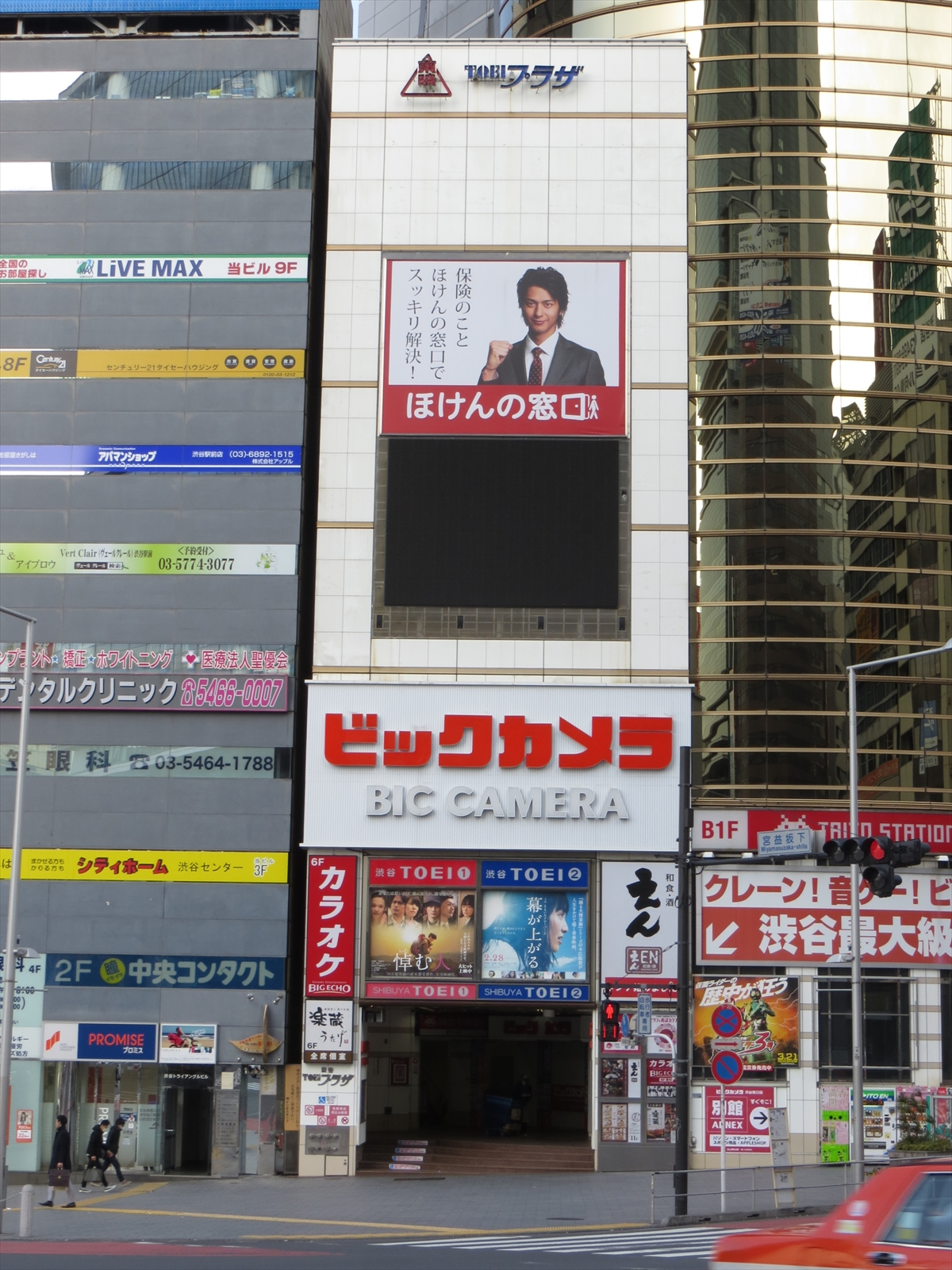
Bic Camera Shibuya Hachikoguchi

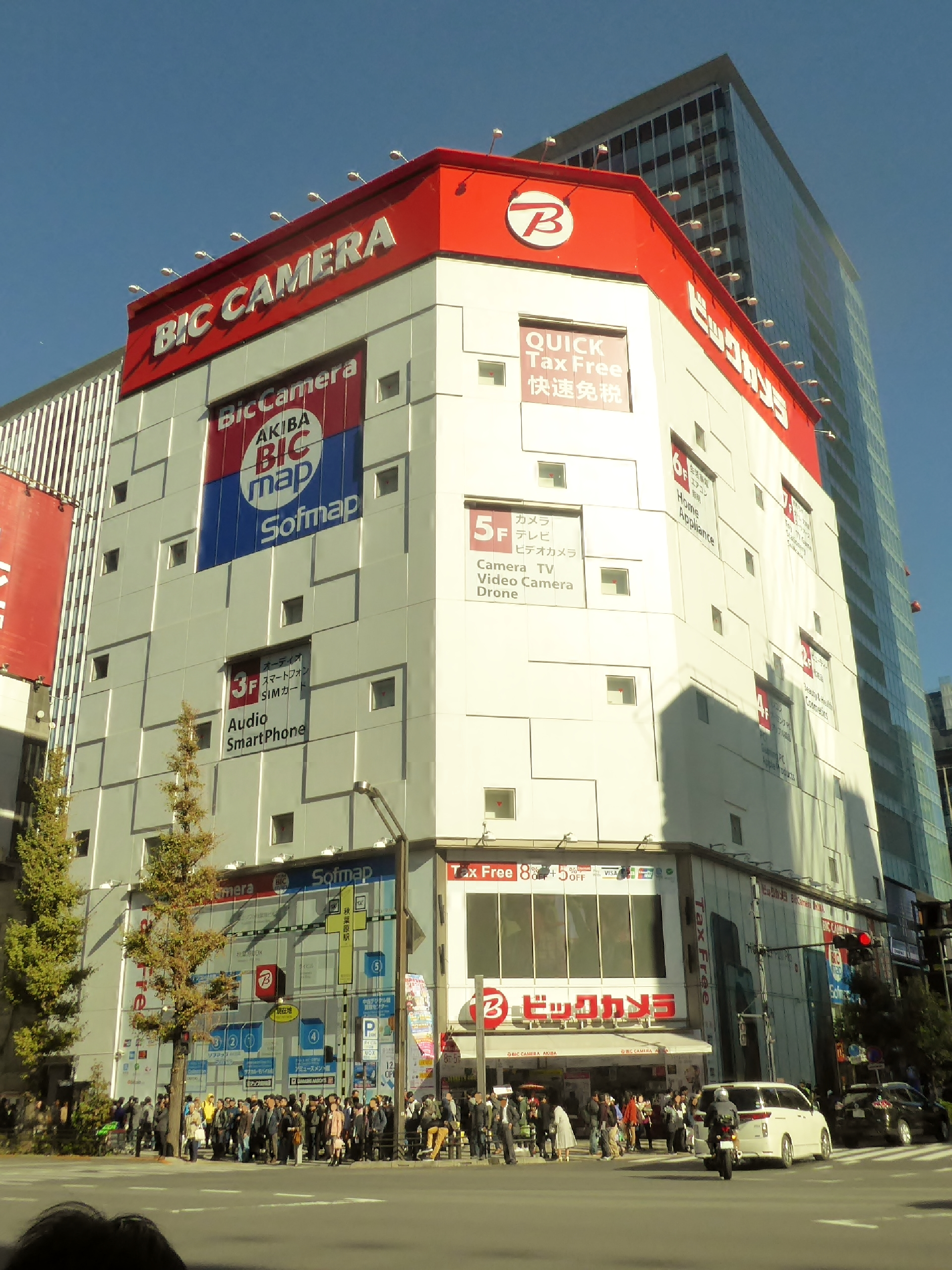
Bic Camera Akihabara

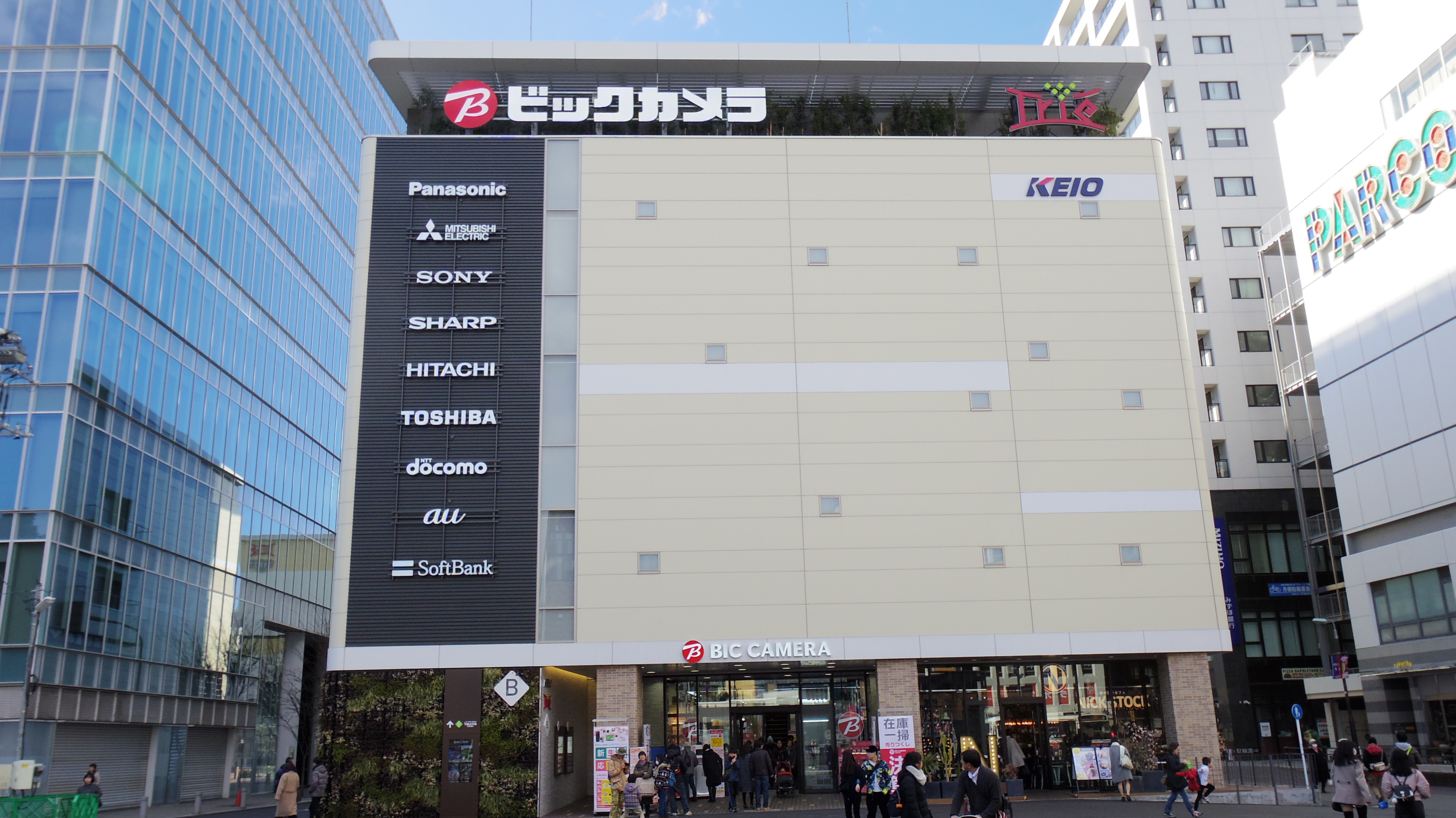
Bic Camera Chōfu

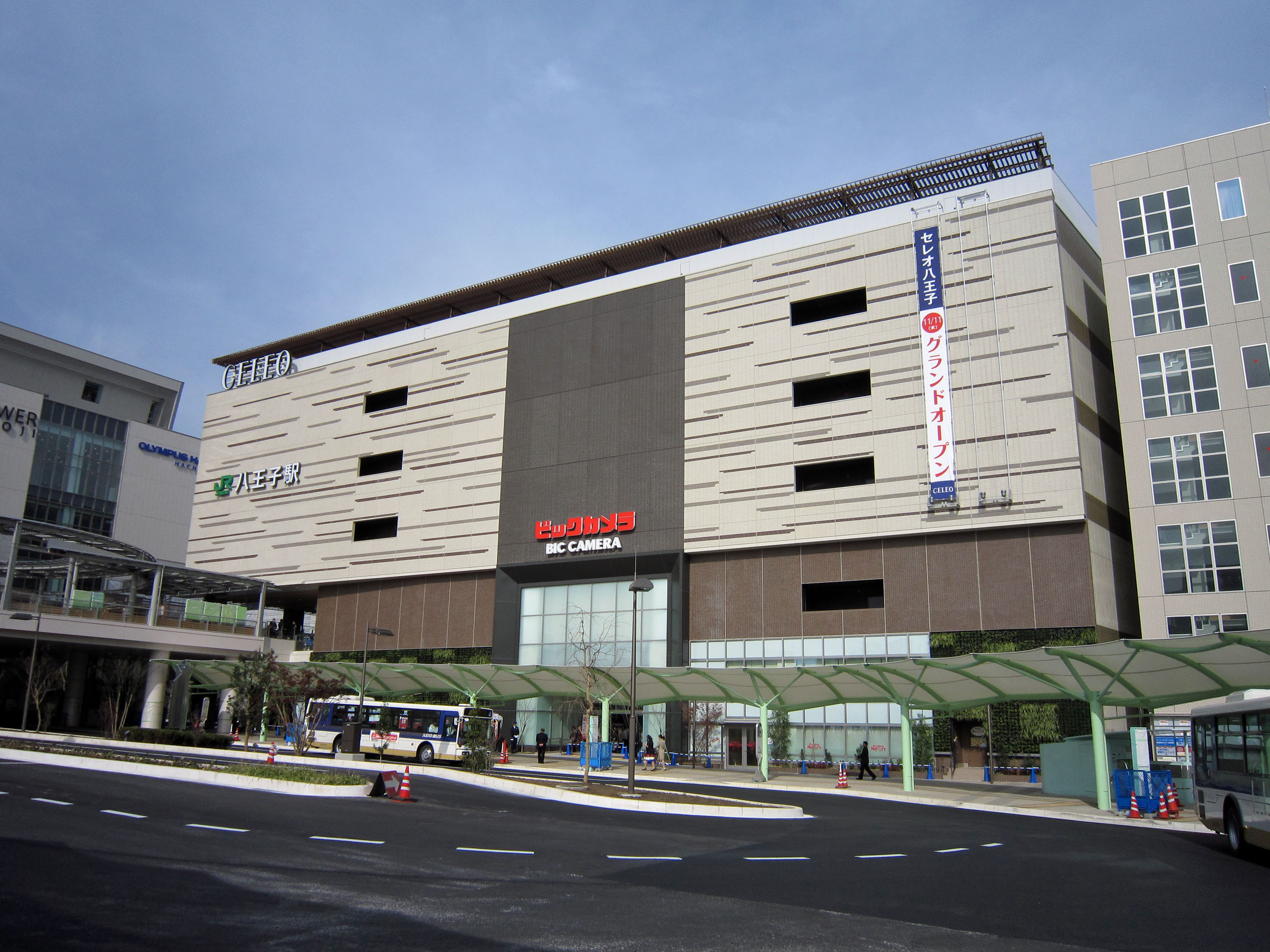
Bic Camera CELEO Hachiōji

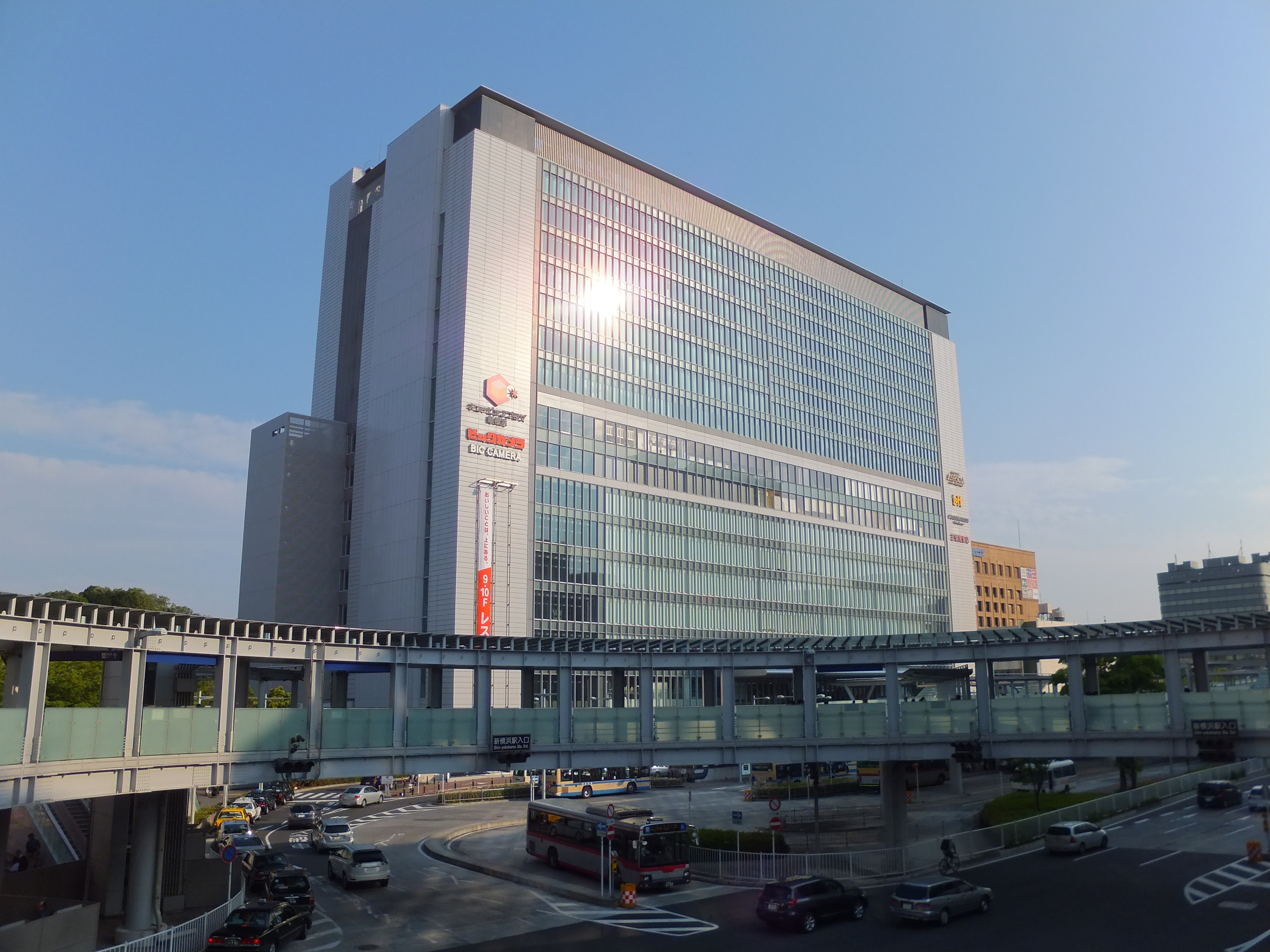
Bic Camera Shin-Yokohama Station

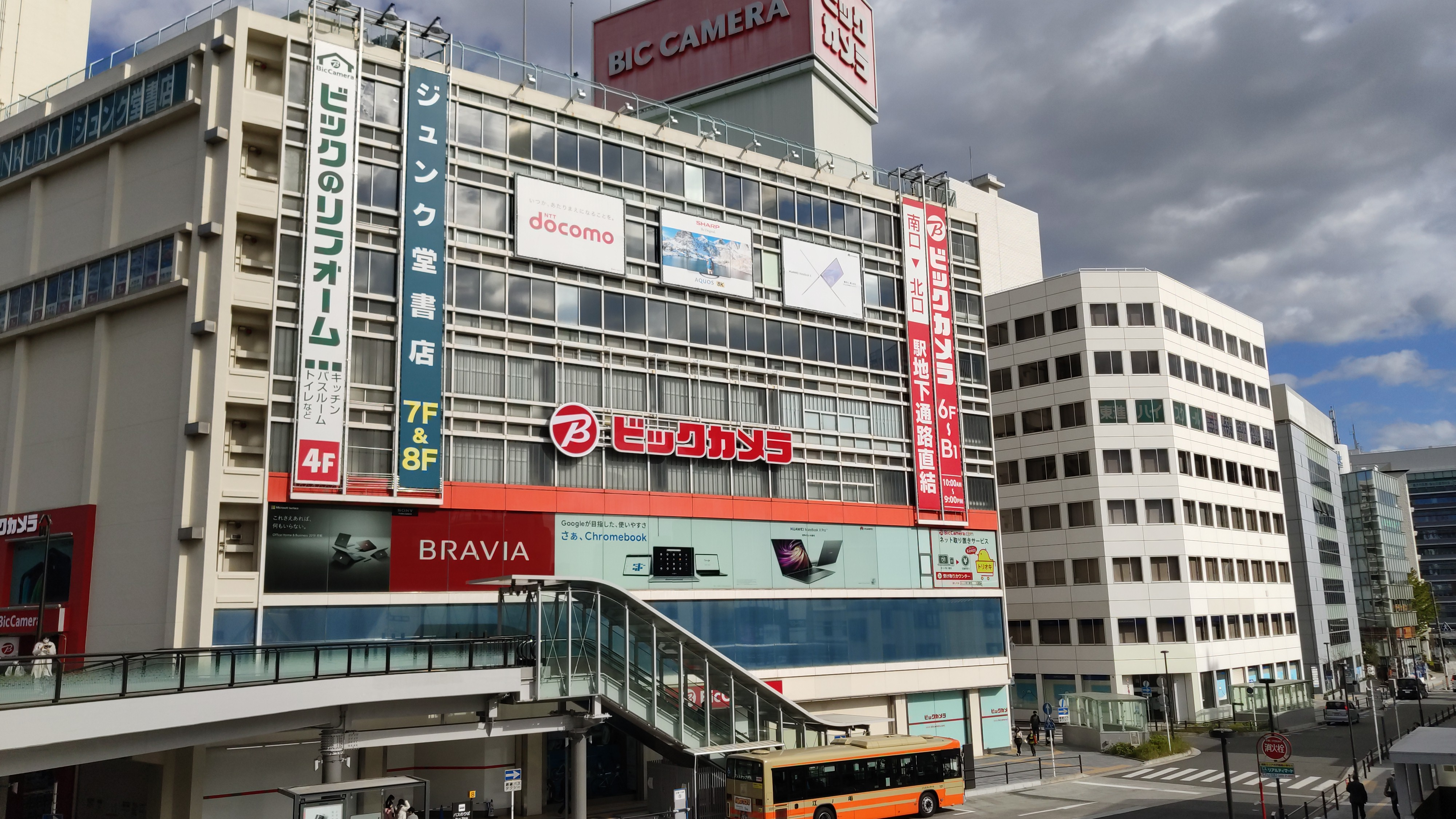
Bic Camera Fujisawa

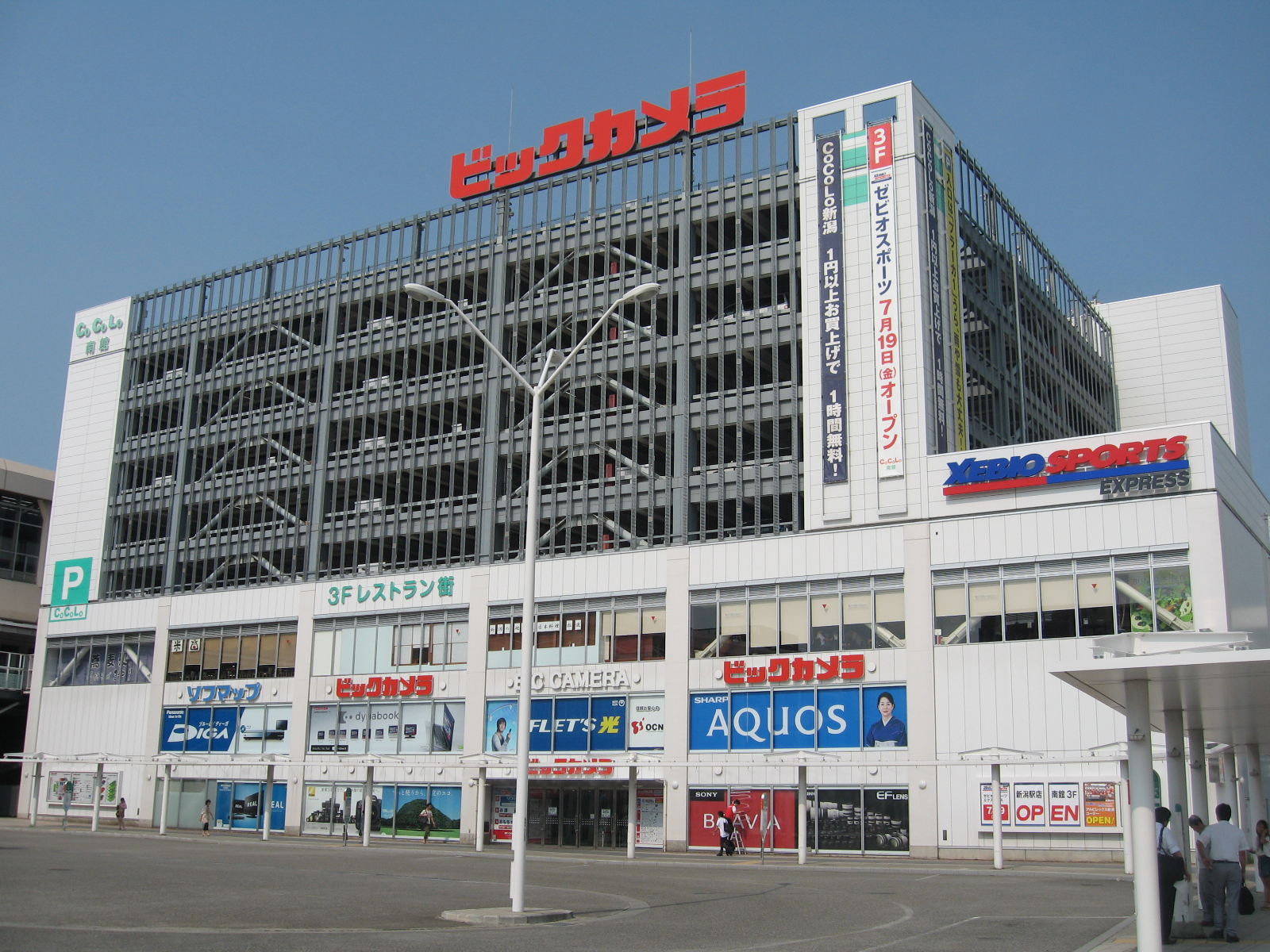
Bic Camera Niigata Station CoCoLo South Building

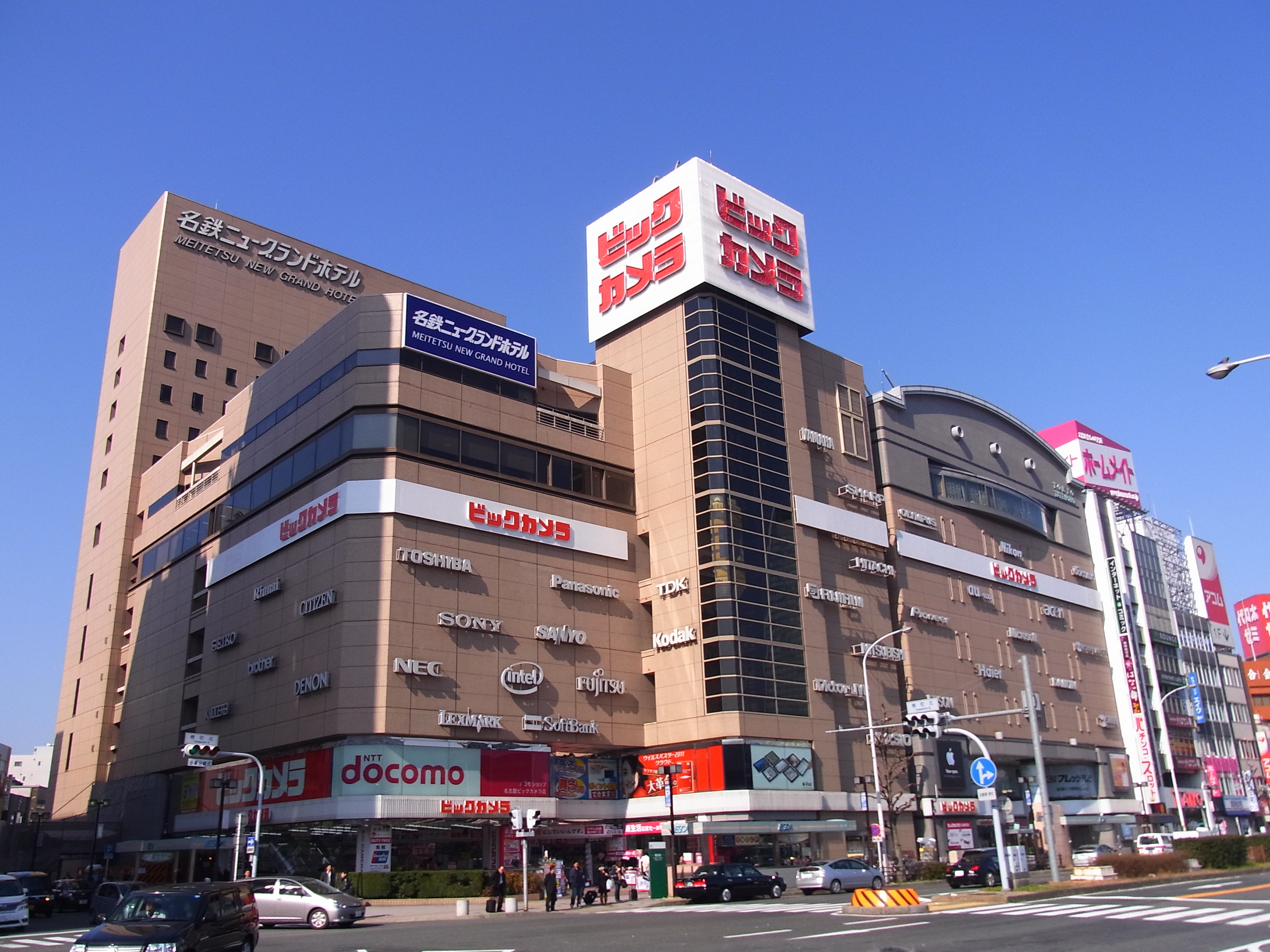
Bic Camera Nagoya Station West store

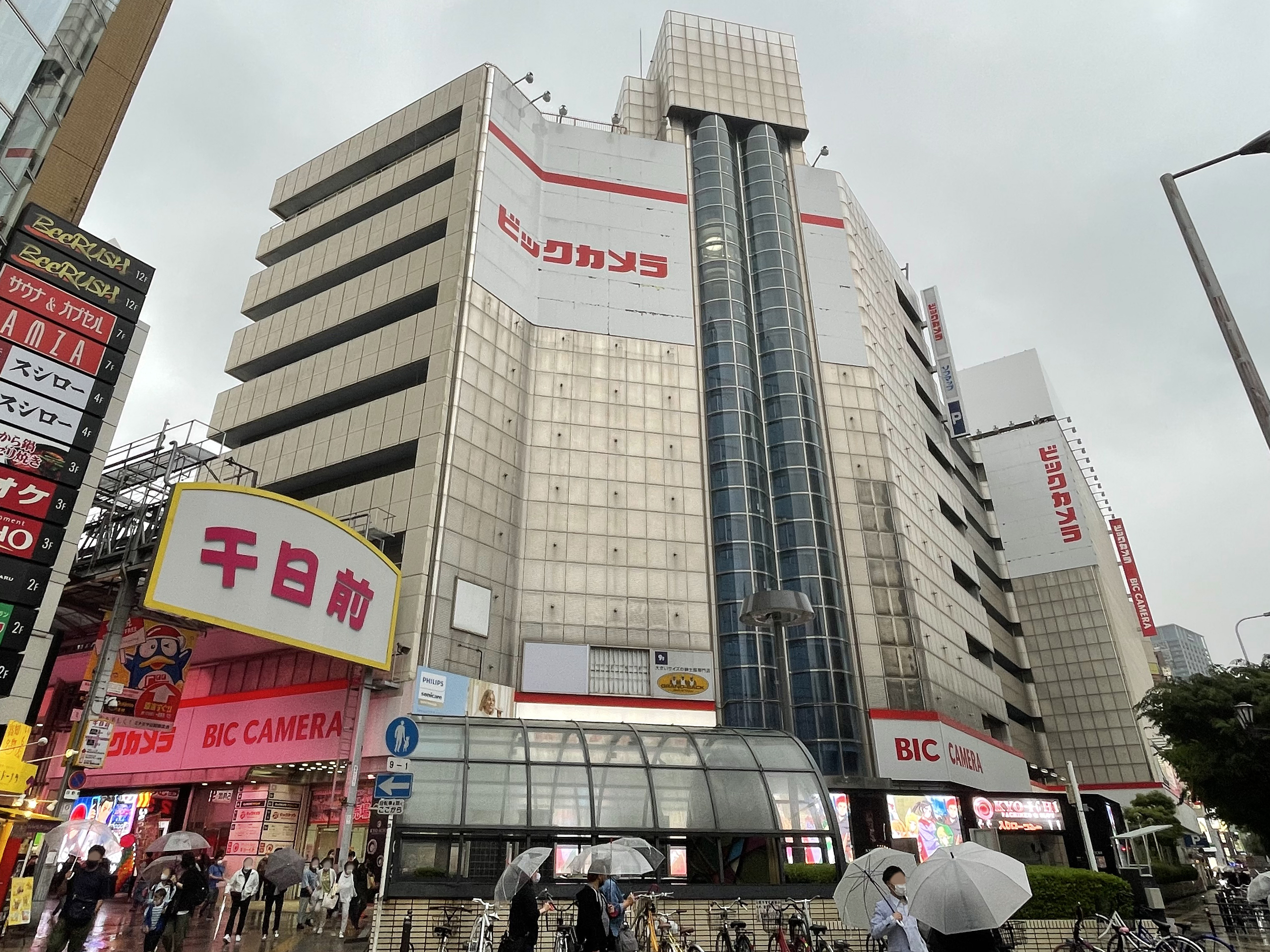
Bic Camera Namba

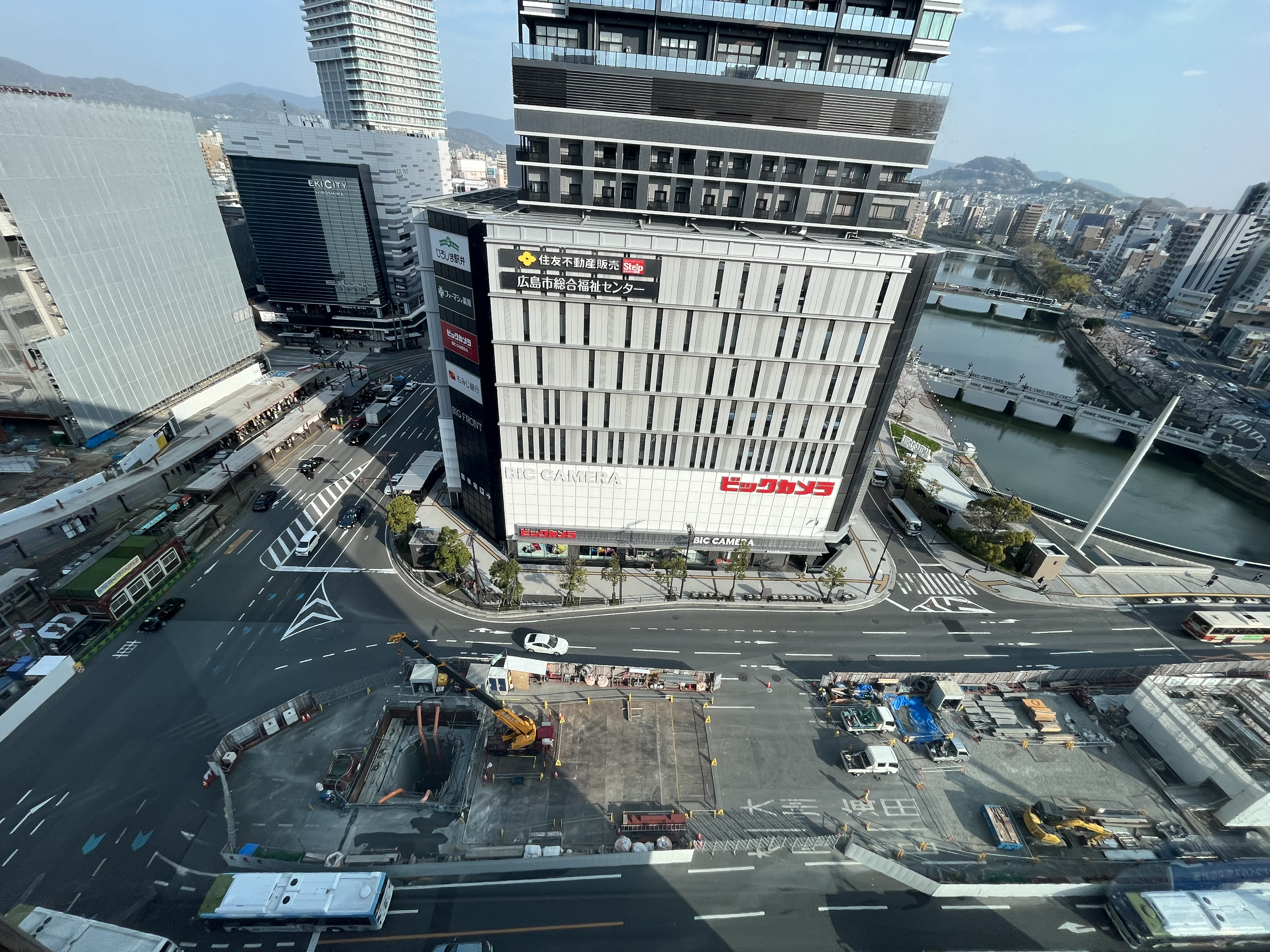
Bic Camera Hiroshima

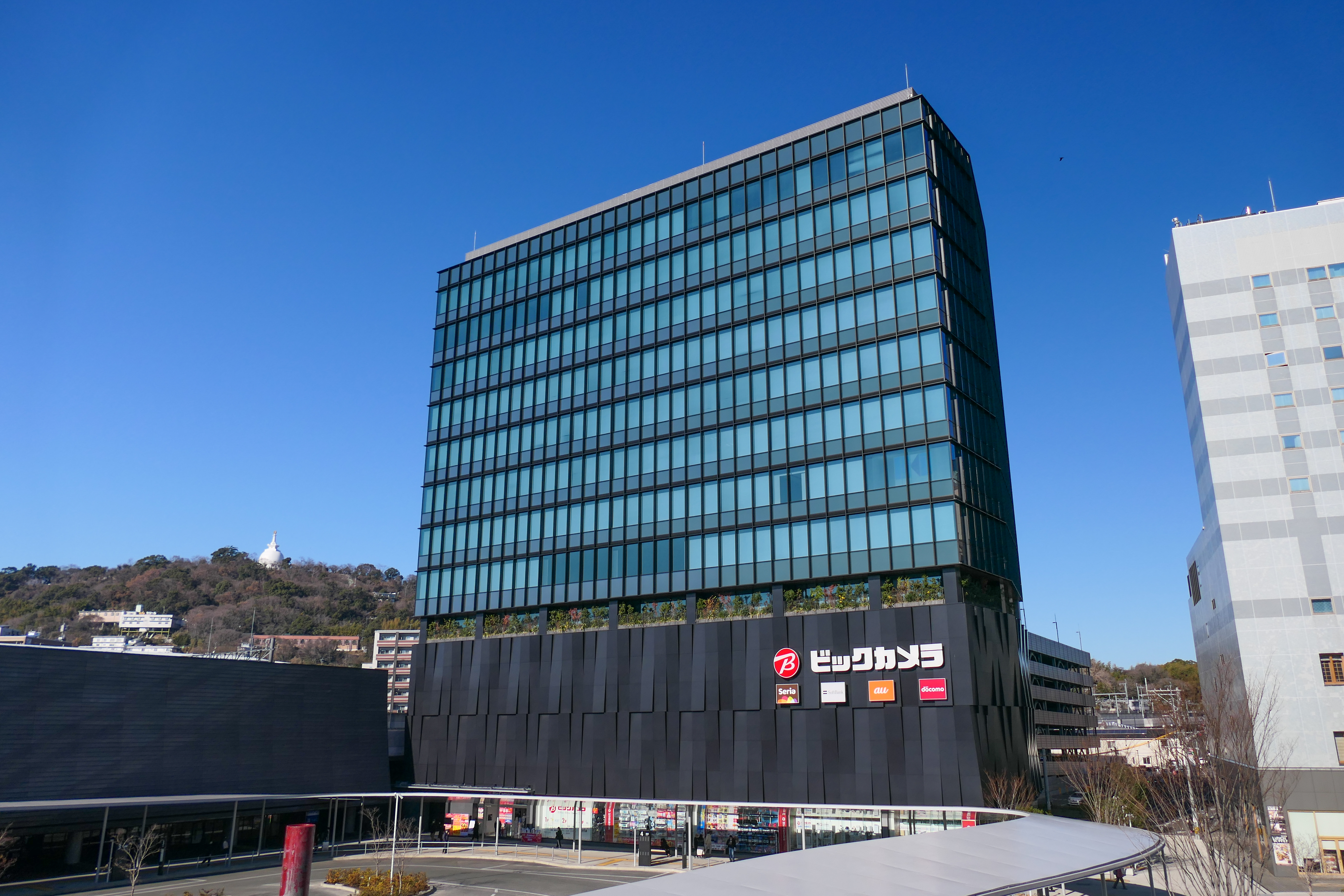
Bic Camera Kumamoto

== Commercials and jingles ==
=== Bic Camera's theme song ===
Bic Camera's original jingle was titled "Bic Camera no Uta" (ビックカメラの歌, Bikku Kamera no Uta; lit. "Bic Camera Song"), which was used in TV commercials and broadcast within the stores. The jingle's melody was loosely based on the enka song "Tabako-ya no Musume" (煙草屋の娘 / タバコやの娘; lit. "The Girl at the Tobacconist"), which, in turn, traces its roots to the American hymn "Shall We Gather at the River?". The song's original lyrics for the main branch in Ikebukuro referenced the Ikebukuro Station, the Seibu Ikebukuro Line by the east exit and the Tōbu Tōjō Line by the west exit, as well as Sunshine City. The lyrics were changed for specific branches such as Akihabara and Namba.

=== New Bic Camera theme song ===
In July 2023, Bic Camera launched a new jingle, featuring new lyrics that add the Yamanote Line, the Shōnan–Shinjuku Line, the Saikyō Line, the Tokyo Metro Marunouchi Line, the Tokyo Metro Fukutoshin Line, and the Tokyo Metro Yūrakuchō Line among the eight lines connecting to Ikebukuro, reflecting the district's massive growth as a shopping destination.

On March 1, 2024, the new jingle became the departure melody for the Yamanote Line at Ikebukuro Station.
