= Shimo =

Shimo may refer to:

== Places ==
- Shimo, Toyama, a dissolved municipality in Toyama prefecture, Japan
- Shimo-Daigo, an area in the Daijo-ji temple
- Shimokitazawa, a neighborhood in Setagaya, Tokyo, Japan also known as "Shimo-kitazawa"
- Shimo-Akasaka Castle, a castle in Chihayaakasaka, Osaka Prefecture, Japan
- Shimōsa Province, a province in Japan sometimes referred to as "Shimo-Usa"
- Shimo-fukushima Park, a park in Fukushima-ku, Osaka, Japan
- The Shimo no Michi, one of the three main roads in the Kantō region of Japan built during the Kamakura period
- Shimo-yōden and Shimo-masuda, two villages present at the start of the Municipal Law System in 1886 in Natori District, Miyagi

=== Train stations ===
==== Tokyo, Japan ====
- Shimo Station, Kita
- Shimo-shimmei Station, eastern Tokyo
- Shimo-kitazawa Station, Setagaya
- Shimo-takaido Station, Setagaya
- Shimo-Igusa Station, Suginami
- Shimo-Ochiai Station, Shinjuku
- Shimo-Akatsuka Station, Itabashi
- Shimo-Itabashi Station, Toshima
- Shimomaruko Station, Ōta

==== Hiroshima Prefecture, Japan ====
- Shimo-Gion Station, Asaminami-ku, Hiroshima
- Shimowachi Station, Miyoshi

==== Fukuoka Prefecture, Japan ====
- Shimosone Station, Kokuraminami-ku, Kitakyushu
- Shimoita Station, Tagawa

==== Hokkaidō, Japan ====
- Shimo-Shirataki Station, Engaru, Hokkaido
- Shimo-Toppu Station, Shintotsukawa, Hokkaidō
- Shimo-Shibetsu Station, Shibetsu, Kamikawa Subprefecture, Hokkaidō
- Minami-Shimo-Toppu Station, Shintotsukawa, Hokkaidō
- Shimo-Kanayama Station, Minamifurano, Hokkaidō

==== Shizuoka Prefecture, Japan ====
- Shimo-Togari Station, Nagaizumi
- Shimokawai Station, Tenryū-ku, Hamamatsu

==== Wakayama Prefecture, Japan ====
- Shimohyōgo Station (Wakayama), Hashimoto
- Shimo-Kosawa Station, Kudoyama, Ito District

==== Mie Prefecture, Japan ====
- Shimo-Fukaya Station, Kuwana
- Shimo-Noshiro Station, Kuwana

==== Other stations in Japan ====
- Shimoyoshida Station, Fujiyoshida, Yamanashi
- Shimoshii Station, Eiheiji, Yoshida District, Fukui Prefecture
- Shimo-Imaichi Station, Nikkō, Tochigi
- Shimoasō Station, Kawabe, Kamo District, Gifu Prefecture
- Shimo-Suwa Station, Shimosuwa, Suwa District, Nagano Prefecture
- Shimo Otai Station, Kiyosu, Aichi Prefecture
- Shimo-Yamaguchi Station, Tokorozawa, Saitama
- Shimo-Shinden Station, Kiryū, Gunma
- Shimogōri Station, Kimitsu, Chiba Prefecture
- Shimonagaya Station, Kōnan-ku, Yokohama, Kanagawa
- Shimo-Ogawa Station, Hitachiōmiya, Ibaraki
- Shimo-Goshiro Station, Nikkō, Tochigi
- Shimo-Soga Station, Odawara, Kanagawa

== People ==
- Alexandra Shimo, Canadian writer
- Fumihiko Shimo, Japanese screenwriter and novelist
- Li Shimo (born 1968), or Eric X. Li, Chinese venture capitalist and political scientist
- Shimo Zhang (born 2008), Chinese racing driver

== Other uses ==
- Shimo, a fictional kaiju in the 2024 film Godzilla x Kong: The New Empire
