= Tsurunuma Station =

Railway station in Urausu, Hokkaido, Japan

Tsurunuma Station 鶴沼駅
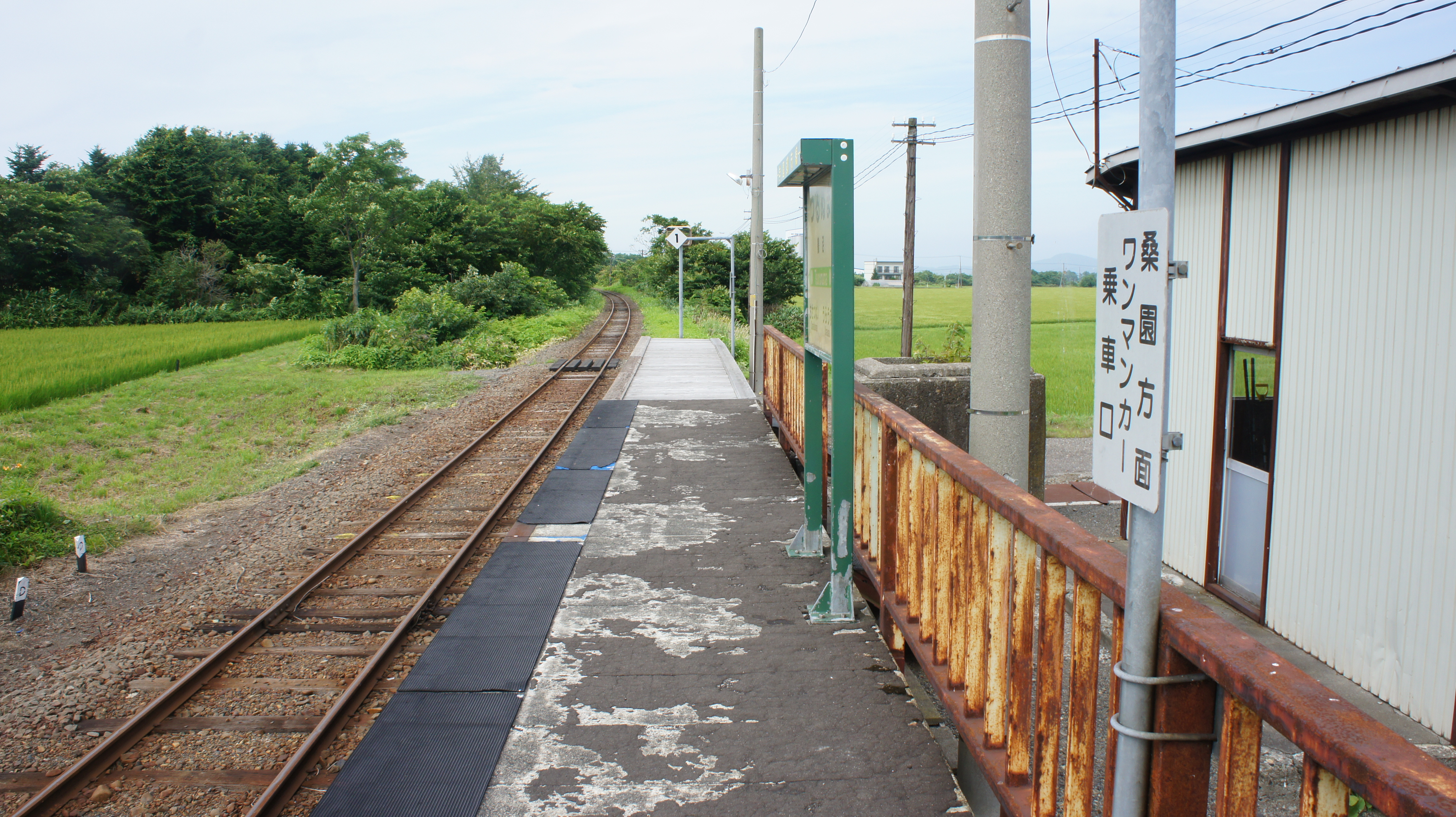
- Station platform (August 2017)

General information
- Location: Japan
- Coordinates: 43°27′27.78″N 141°50′26.36″E
- Owner: JR Hokkaido
- Line: ■ Sasshō Line
- Distance: 66.1km from Sōen
- Platforms: 1
- Tracks: 1

History
- Opened: 16 November 1956
- Closed: 17 April 2020

Passengers
- 2013-2017: 0.0 average daily
Location

Tsurunuma Station (鶴沼駅, Tsurunuma-eki) was a train station in Urausu, Kabato District, Hokkaidō, Japan.

== Lines ==
- Hokkaido Railway Company
  - Sasshō Line

== Station layout ==
The station had a side platform serving one track. The unstaffed station building is located beside the platform.

== Adjacent stations ==
«	Service	»
Sasshō Line
Urausu	-	Osatsunai

== History ==
The station opened on 16 November 1956.

In December 2018, it was announced that the station would be closed on May 7, 2020, along with the rest of the non-electrified section of the Sasshō Line. The actual last service was on April 17, 2020 amid the COVID-19 outbreak.
