= Urausu Station =

Railway station in Urausu, Hokkaido, Japan

Urausu Station 浦臼駅
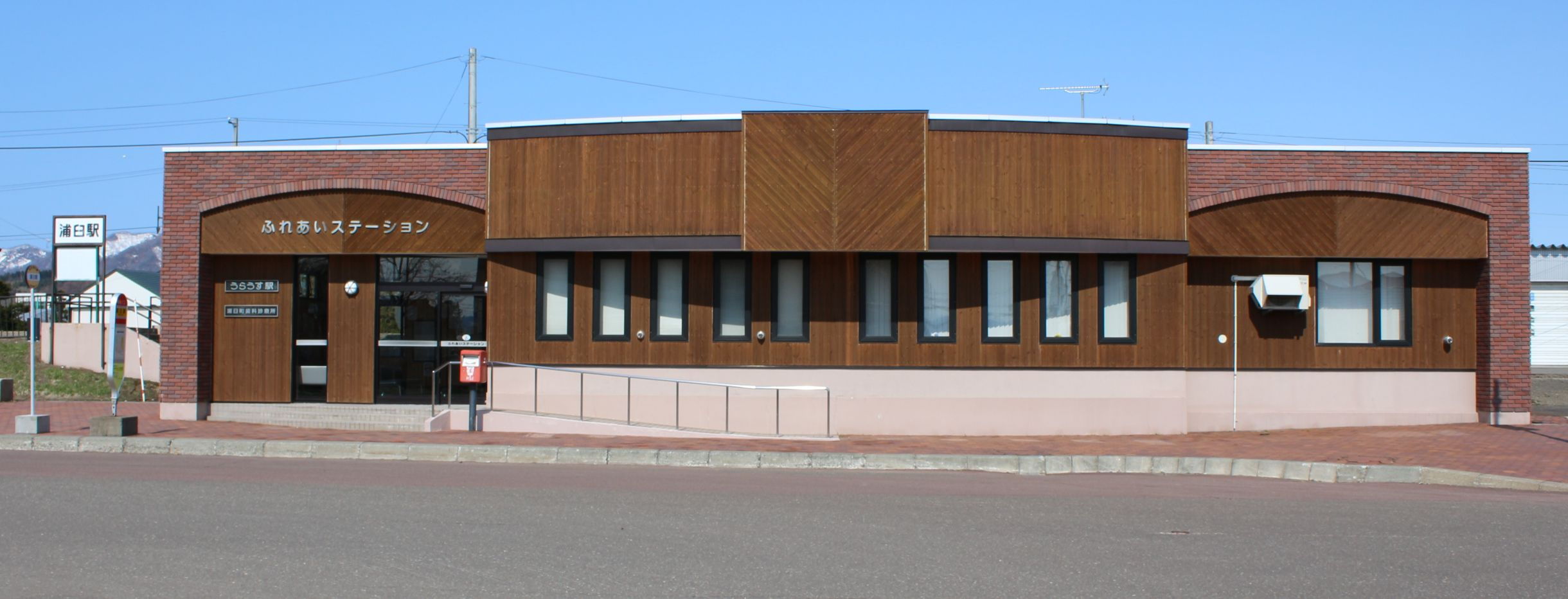
- Station building (April 2020)

General information
- Location: Japan
- Coordinates: 43.4313°N 141.8173°E
- Owner: JR Hokkaido
- Line: ■ Sasshō Line
- Distance: 62.7km from Sōen
- Platforms: 1
- Tracks: 1

History
- Opened: 10 October 1934
- Closed: 17 April 2020

Passengers
- 2014-2018: 11.0 average daily
Location

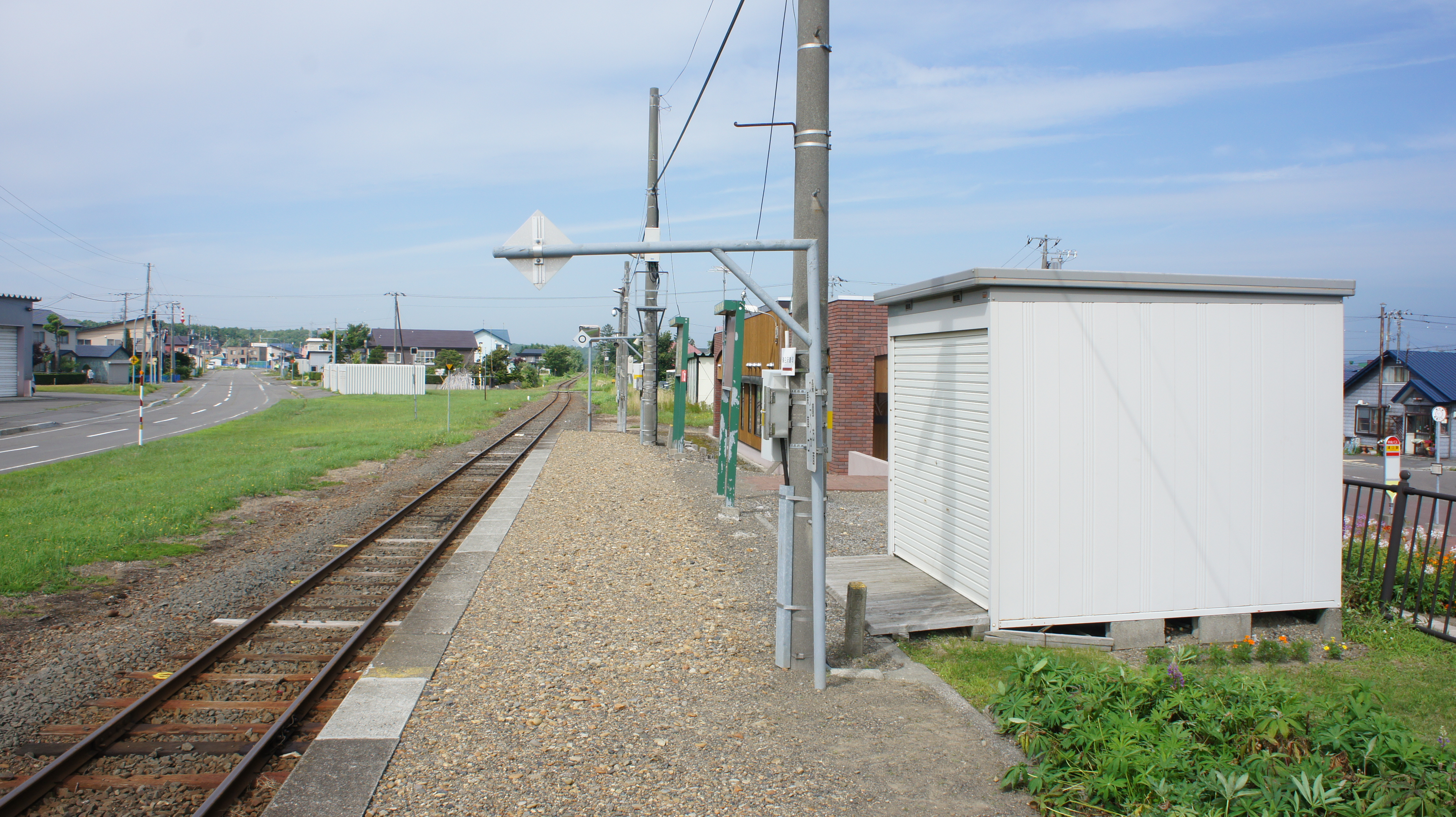
Station platform

Urausu Station (浦臼駅, Urausu-eki) was a train station in Urausu, Kabato District, Hokkaidō, Japan.

== Lines ==
The station was served by the Sassho Line.

== Station layout ==
The station had a side platform serving one track. The unstaffed station building was located beside the platform.

== History ==
The station opened on 10 October 1934.

In December 2018, it was announced that the station would be closed on May 7, 2020, along with the rest of the non-electrified section of the Sasshō Line. The station closed earlier on April 17, 2020, due to the COVID-19 pandemic.

== Adjacent stations ==
«	Service	»
Sasshō Line
Satteki	-	Tsurunuma
