= Chiraiotsu Station =

Railway station in Tsukigata, Hokkaido, Japan

Chiraiotsu Station 知来乙駅
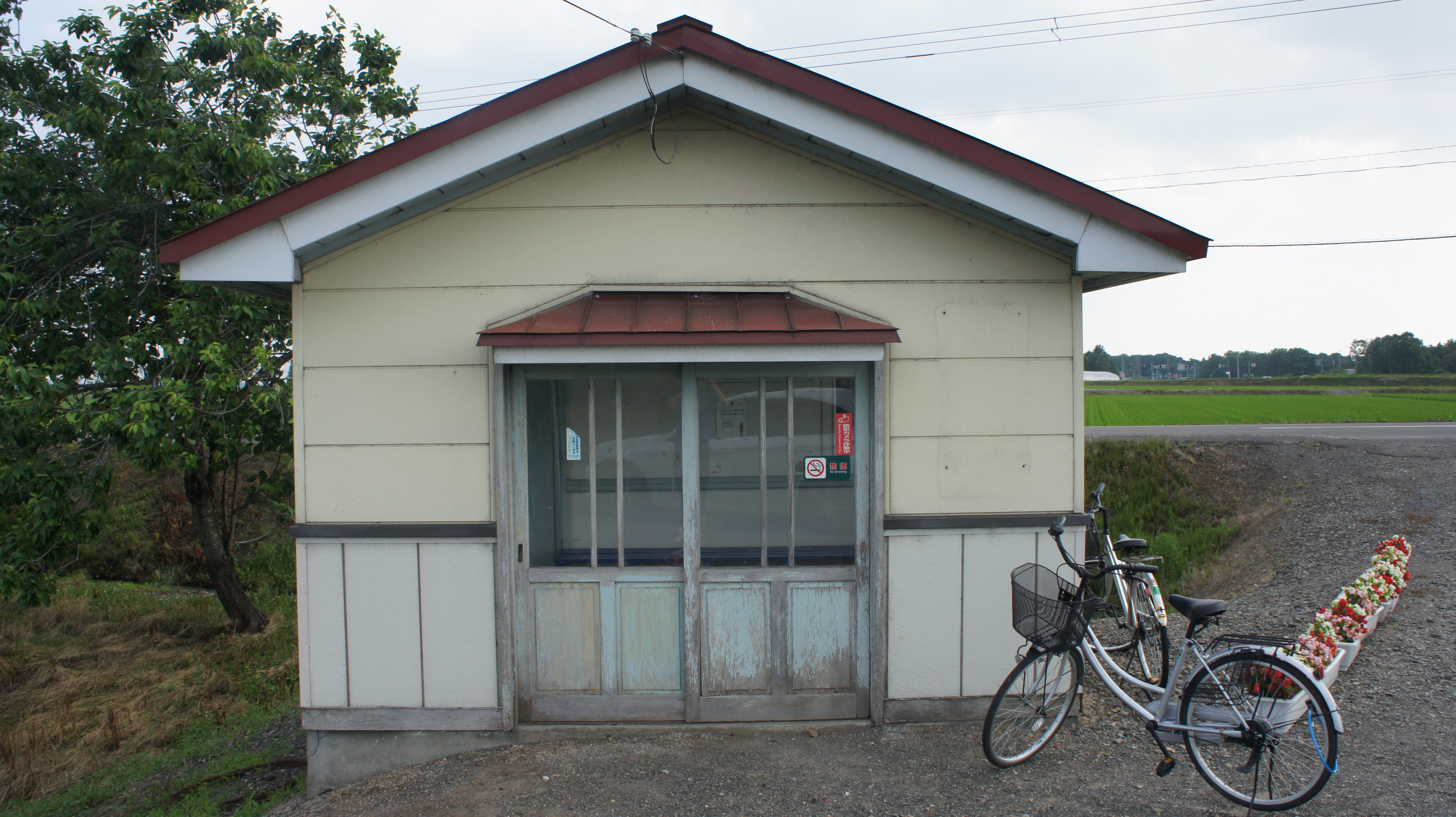
- Station building (July 2017)

General information
- Location: Japan
- Coordinates: 43.3318°N 141.6495°E
- Owner: JR Hokkaido
- Line: ■ Sasshō Line
- Distance: 44.2km from Sōen
- Platforms: 1
- Tracks: 1

History
- Opened: 1 July 1958
- Closed: 17 April 2020

Passengers
- 2013-2017: 5.0 average daily
Location

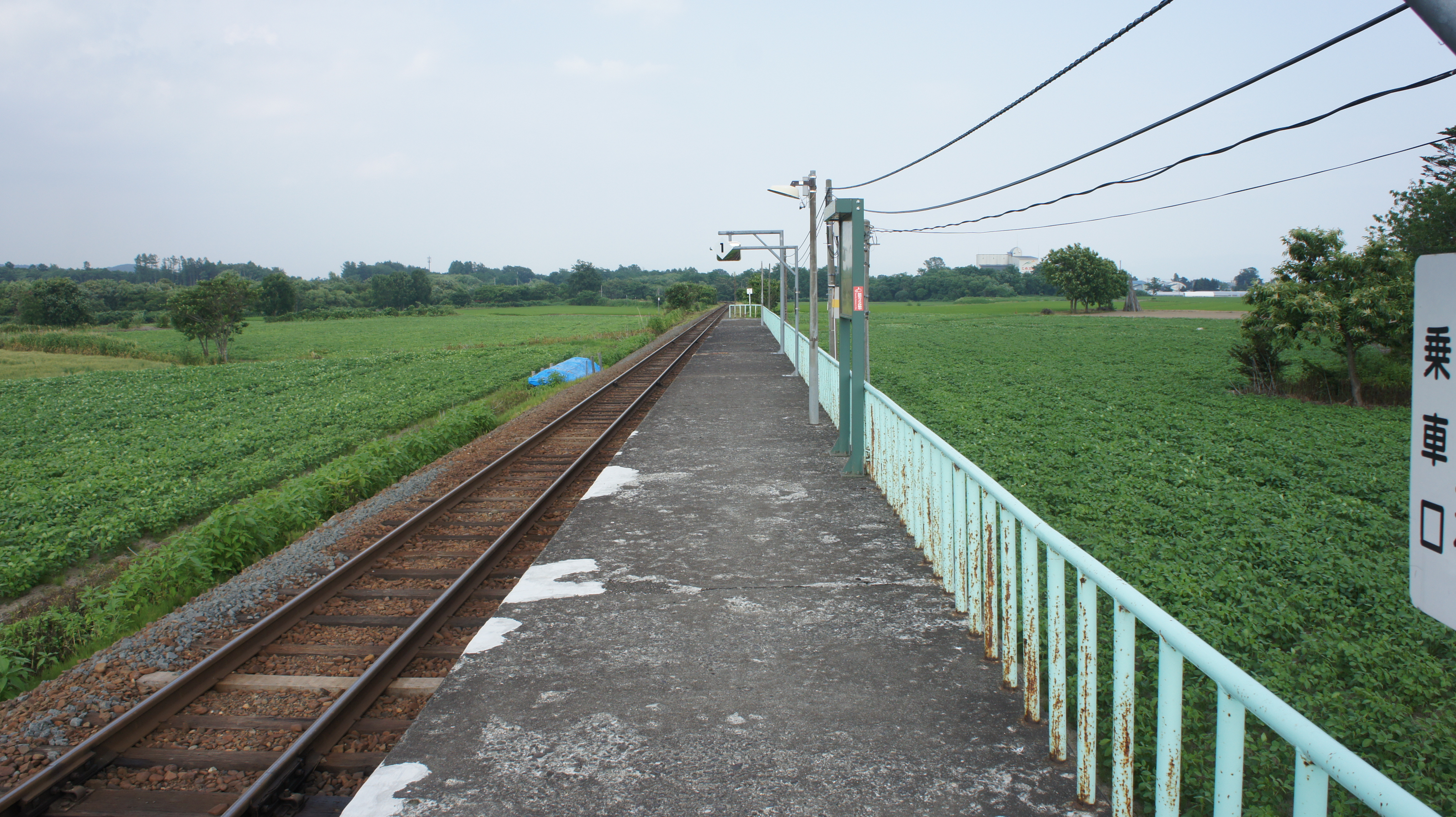
Station platform (July 2017

Chiraiotsu Station (知来乙駅, Chiraiotsu-eki) was a train station in Tsukigata, Kabato District, Hokkaidō, Japan.

== Lines ==
- Hokkaido Railway Company
  - Sasshō Line

== Station layout ==
The station had a side platform serving one track. The station entrance was located on the south end of the platform, where the unstaffed station building was also located.

== Adjacent stations ==
«	Service	»
Sasshō Line
Tsukigaoka	-	Ishikari-Tsukigata

== History ==
The station opened on 1 July 1958.

In December 2018, it was announced that the station would be closed on 7 May 2020, along with the rest of the non-electrified section of the Sasshō Line. The actual last service was on 17 April 2020 amid the COVID-19 outbreak.
