= Osatsunai Station =

Railway station in Urausu, Hokkaido, Japan

Osatsunai Station 於札内駅
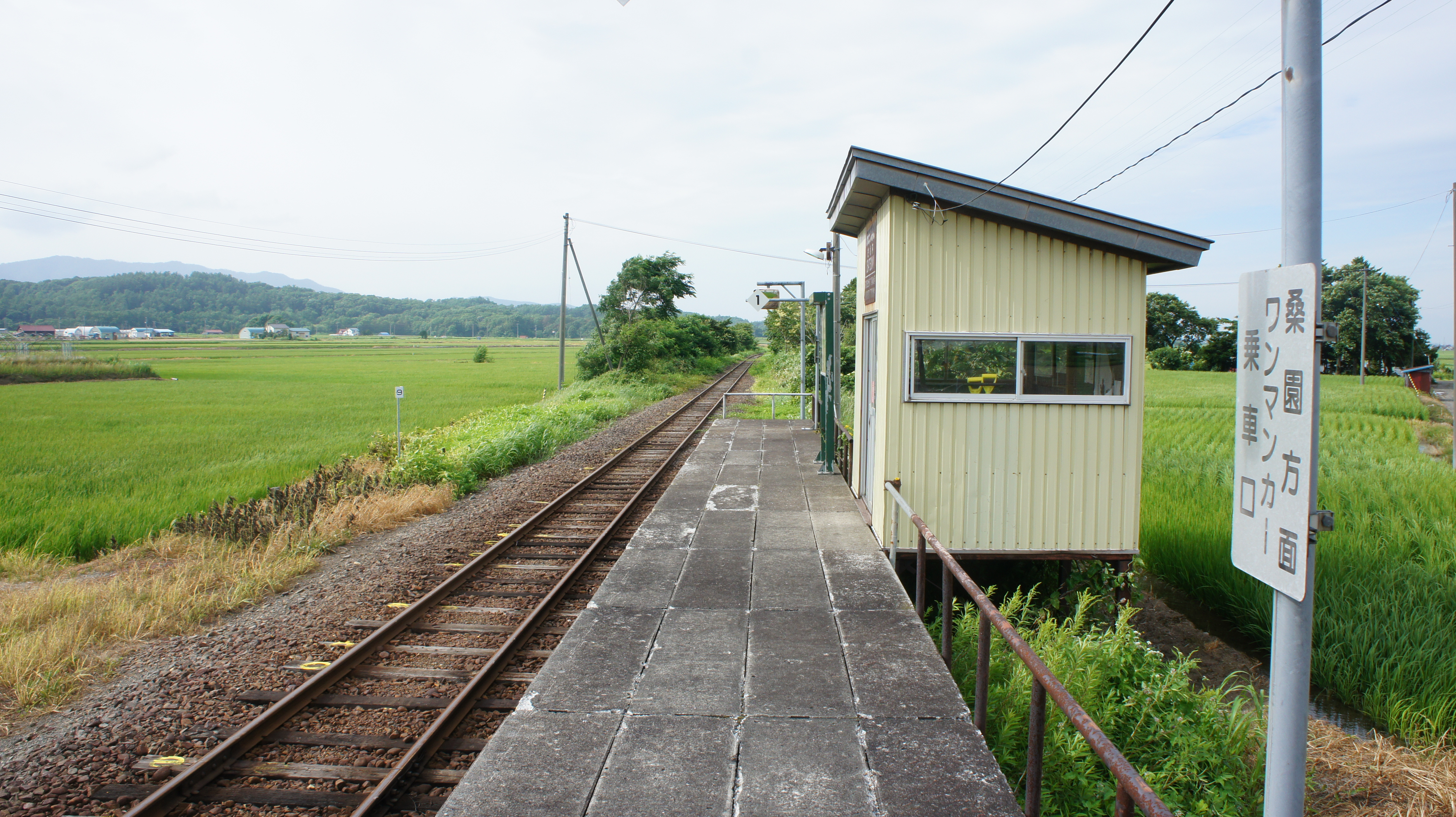
- Station platform (August 2017)

General information
- Location: Japan
- Coordinates: 43.4735°N 141.8400°E
- Owner: JR Hokkaido
- Line: ■ Sasshō Line
- Distance: 67.9km from Sōen
- Platforms: 1
- Tracks: 1

History
- Opened: 1 December 1959
- Closed: 17 April 2020

Passengers
- 2013-2017: 0.8 average daily
Location

Osatsunai Station (於札内駅, Osatsunai-eki) was a train station in Urausu, Kabato District, Hokkaidō, Japan.

== Lines ==
- Hokkaido Railway Company
  - Sasshō Line

== Station layout ==
The station had a side platform serving one track. There is a small shelter on the platform.

== Adjacent stations ==
«	Service	»
Sasshō Line
Tsurunuma	-	Minami-Shimo-Toppu

== History ==
The station opened on 1 December 1959.

In December 2018, it was announced that the station would be closed on May 7, 2020, along with the rest of the non-electrified section of the Sasshō Line. The actual last service was on April 17, 2020 amid the COVID-19 outbreak.
