= Sappinai Station =

Railway station in Tsukigata, Hokkaido, Japan

Sappinai Station 札比内駅
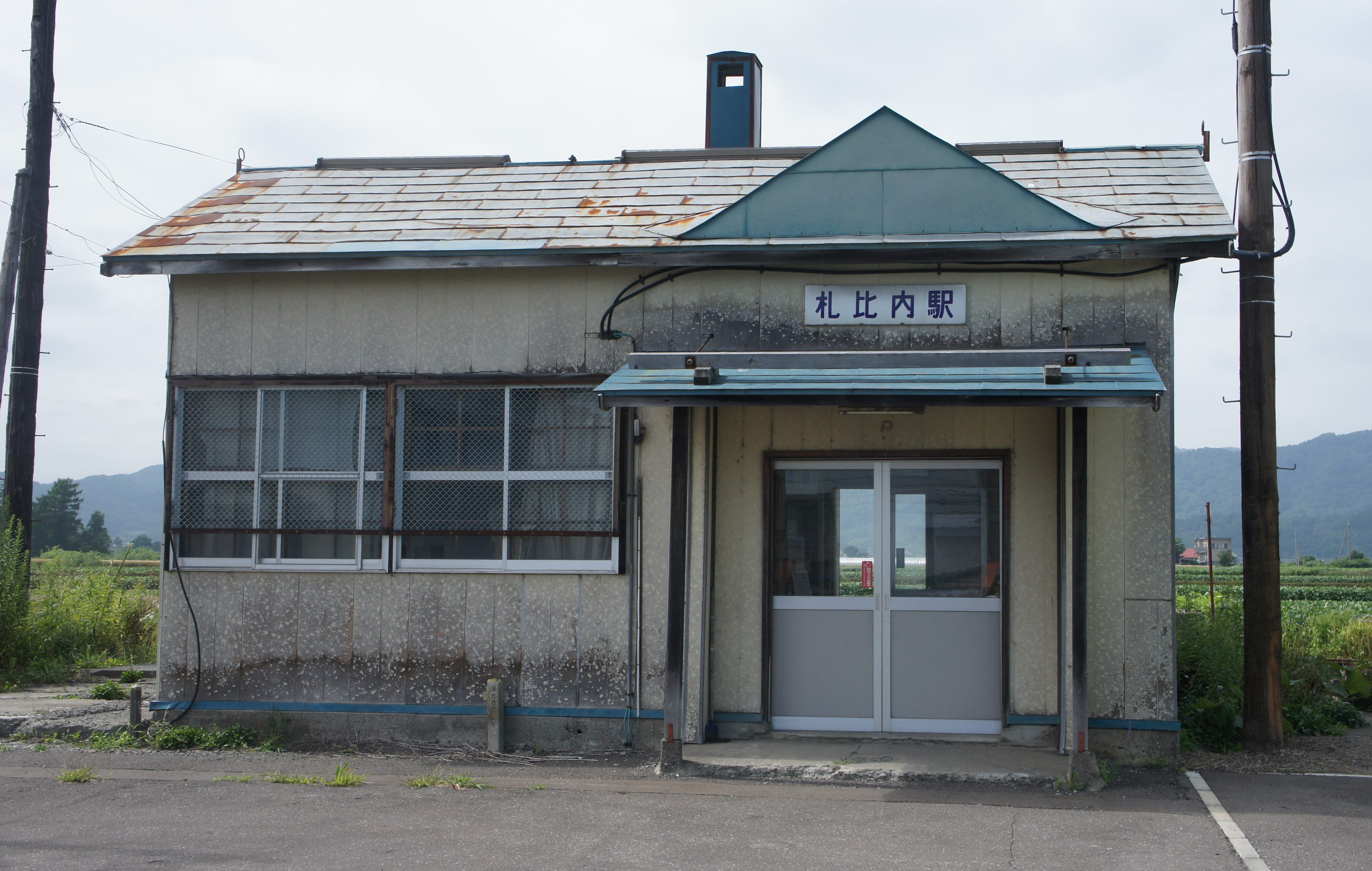
- The station building, August 2017

General information
- Location: Tsukigata, Kabato, Hokkaido; Japan
- Coordinates: 43.3706°N 141.7429°E
- Owner: JR Hokkaido
- Line: ■ Sasshō Line
- Distance: 53.5km from Sōen
- Platforms: 1
- Tracks: 1

History
- Opened: 3 October 1935
- Closed: 17 April 2020

Passengers
- 2013-2017: 3.2 average daily
Location

Sappinai Station (札比内駅, Sappinai-eki) was a railway station on the Sasshō Line in Tsukigata, Kabato District, Hokkaido, Japan, operated by Hokkaido Railway Company (JR Hokkaido).

== Lines ==
Sappinai Station was served by the Sasshō Line.

== Station layout ==
The station had a side platform serving one track. The unstaffed station building was located beside the platform.

== Adjacent stations ==
«	Service	»
Sasshō Line
Toyogaoka	-	Osokinai

== History ==
The station opened on 3 October 1935. With the privatization of JNR on 1 April 1987, the station came under the control of JR Hokkaido.

In December 2018, it was announced that the station would be closed on 7 May 2020, along with the rest of the non-electrified section of the Sasshō Line. The actual last service was on 17 April 2020 amid the COVID-19 outbreak.
