= Toyogaoka Station =

Railway station in Tsukigata, Hokkaido, Japan

Toyogaoka Station 豊ヶ岡駅
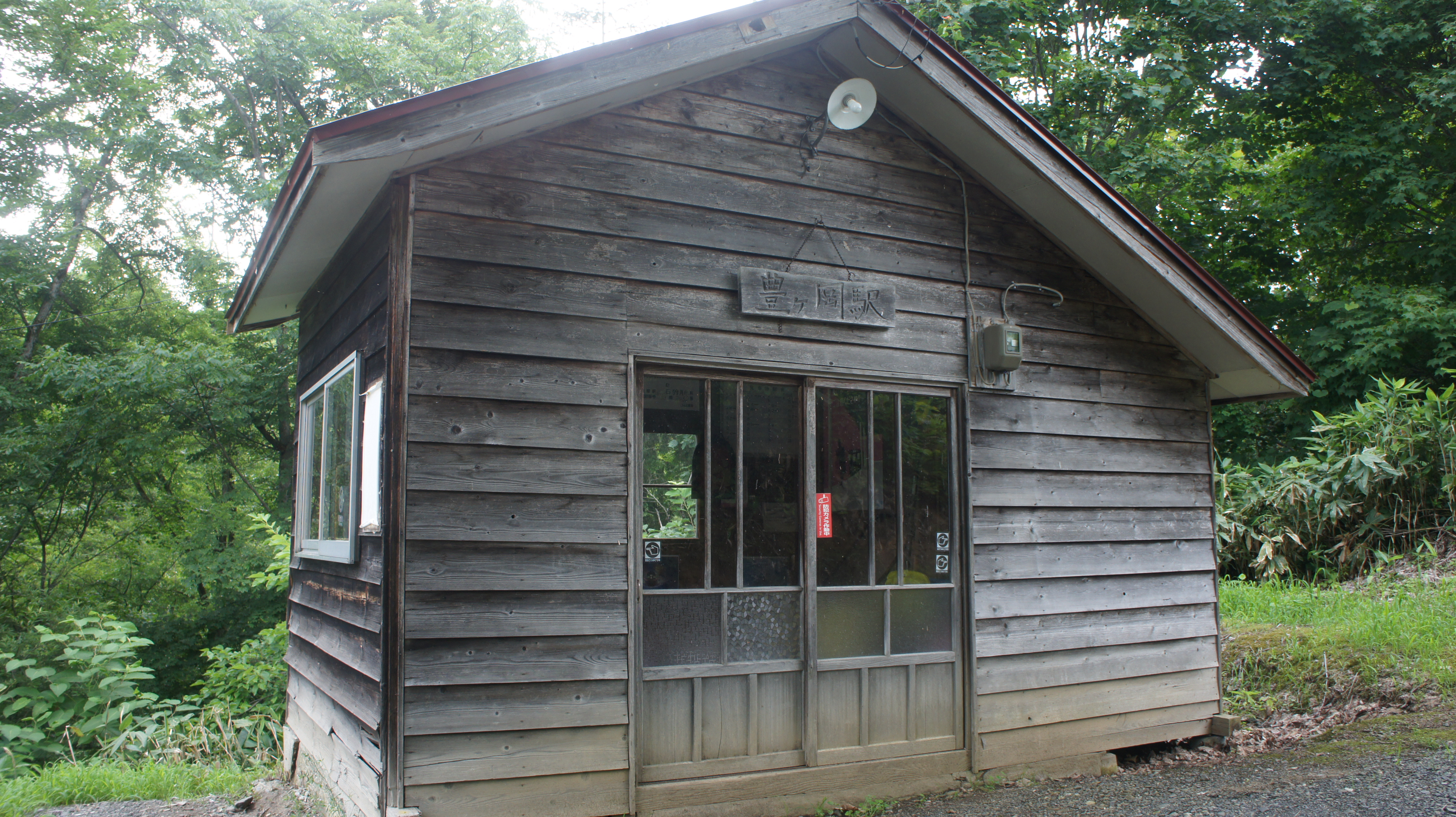
- Station building (July 2017)

General information
- Location: Japan
- Coordinates: 43.3668°N 141.7141°E
- Owner: JR Hokkaido
- Line: ■ Sasshō Line
- Distance: 51.0km from Sōen
- Platforms: 1
- Tracks: 1

History
- Opened: 10 September 1960
- Closed: 17 April 2020

Passengers
- 2013-2017: 1.0 average daily
Location

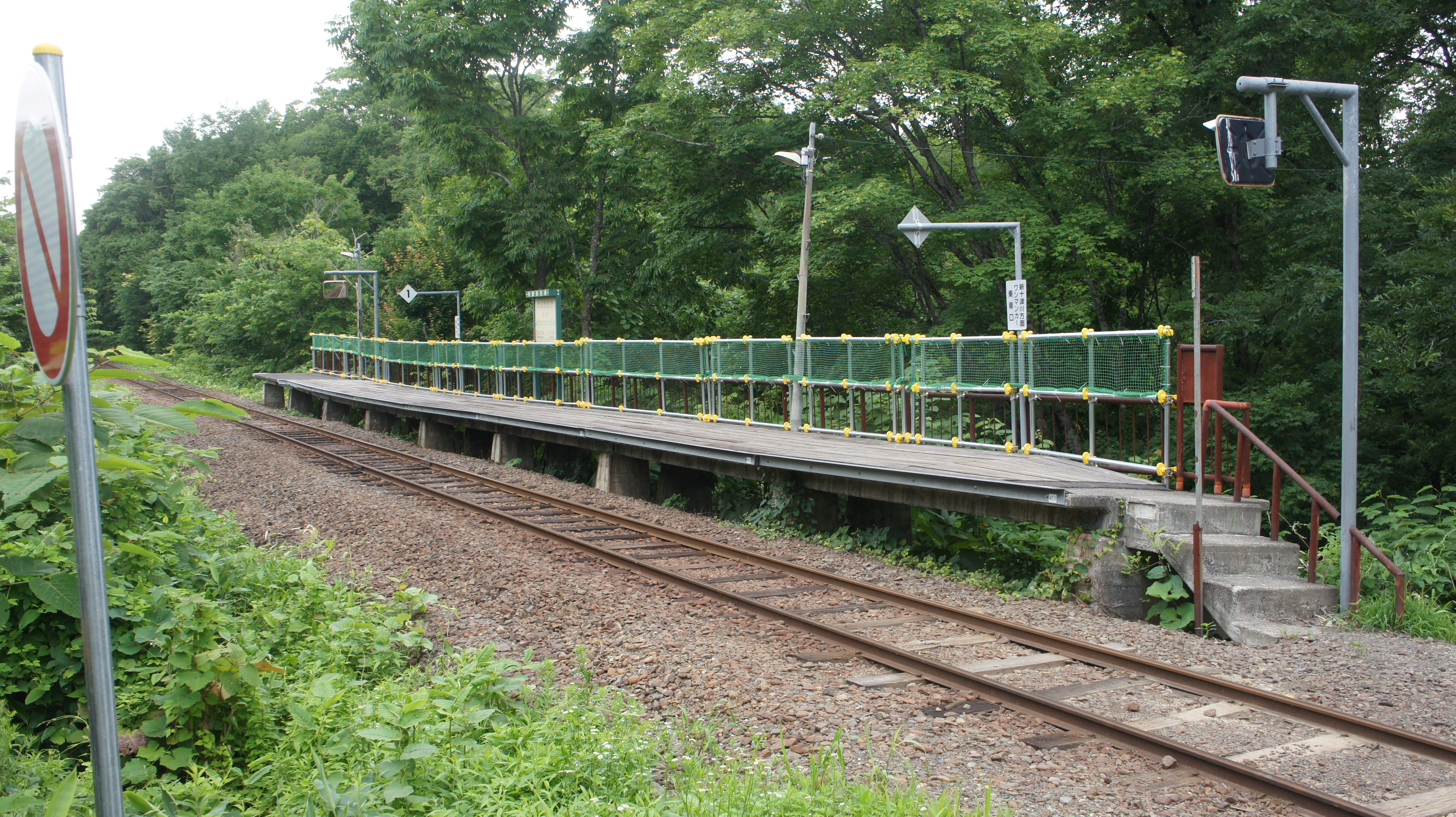
The station platform (July 2017)

Toyogaoka Station (豊ヶ岡駅, Toyogaoka-eki) was a train station in Tsukigata, Kabato District, Hokkaidō, Japan.

== Lines ==
- Hokkaido Railway Company
  - Sasshō Line

== Station layout ==
The station had a side platform serving one track. The unstaffed station building was located a short distance from the platform.

== Adjacent stations ==
«	Service	»
Sasshō Line
Ishikari-Tsukigata	-	Sappinai

== History ==
The station opened on 10 September 1960.

In December 2018, it was announced that the station would be closed on 7 May 2020, along with the rest of the non-electrified section of the Sasshō Line. The actual last service was on 17 April 2020 amid the COVID-19 outbreak.
