= Osokinai Station =

Railway station in Urausu, Hokkaido, Japan

Osokinai Station 晩生内駅
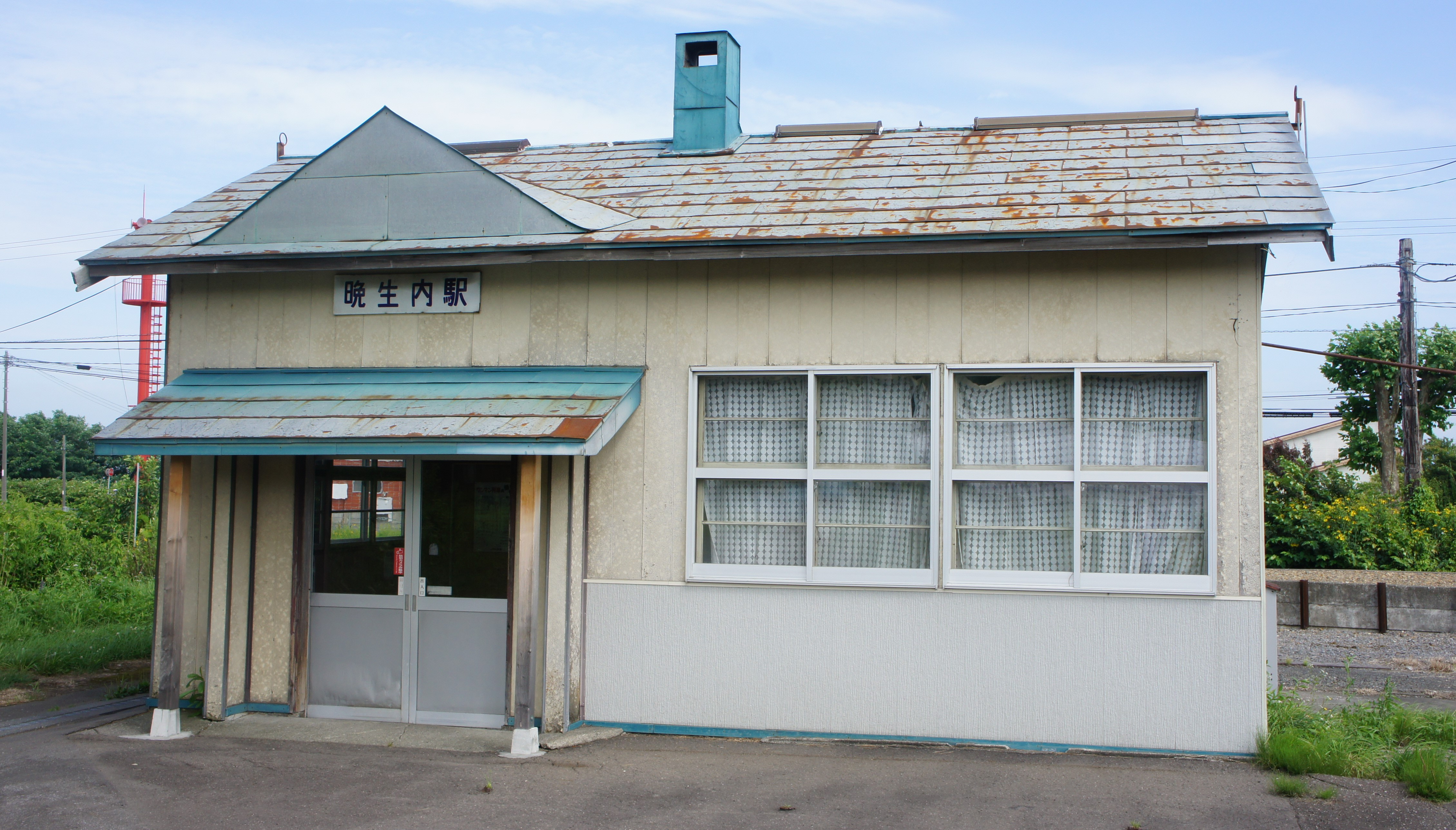
- Station building (August 2017)

General information
- Location: Japan
- Coordinates: 43.3999°N 141.7793°E
- Owner: JR Hokkaido
- Line: ■ Sasshō Line
- Distance: 58.0km from Sōen
- Platforms: 1
- Tracks: 1

History
- Opened: 3 October 1935
- Closed: 17 April 2020

Passengers
- 2013-2017: 3.2 average daily
Location

Osokinai Station (晩生内駅, Osokinai-eki) was a railway station on the Sasshō Line in Urausu, Kabato District, Hokkaidō, Japan, operated by Hokkaido Railway Company (JR Hokkaido).

== Lines ==
Osokinai Station was served by the Sasshō Line.

== Station layout ==
The station had a side platform serving one track. The unstaffed station building was located beside the platform.

== Adjacent stations ==
| « | Service | » |
Sasshō Line
| Sappinai | - | Satteki |

== History ==
The station opened on 3 October 1935.

In December 2018, it was announced that the station would be closed on 7 May 2020, along with the rest of the non-electrified section of the Sasshō Line. The actual last service was on 17 April 2020 amid the COVID-19 outbreak.
