= Ishikari-Tsukigata Station =

Railway station in Tsukigata, Hokkaido, Japan

Ishikari-Tsukigata Station 石狩月形駅
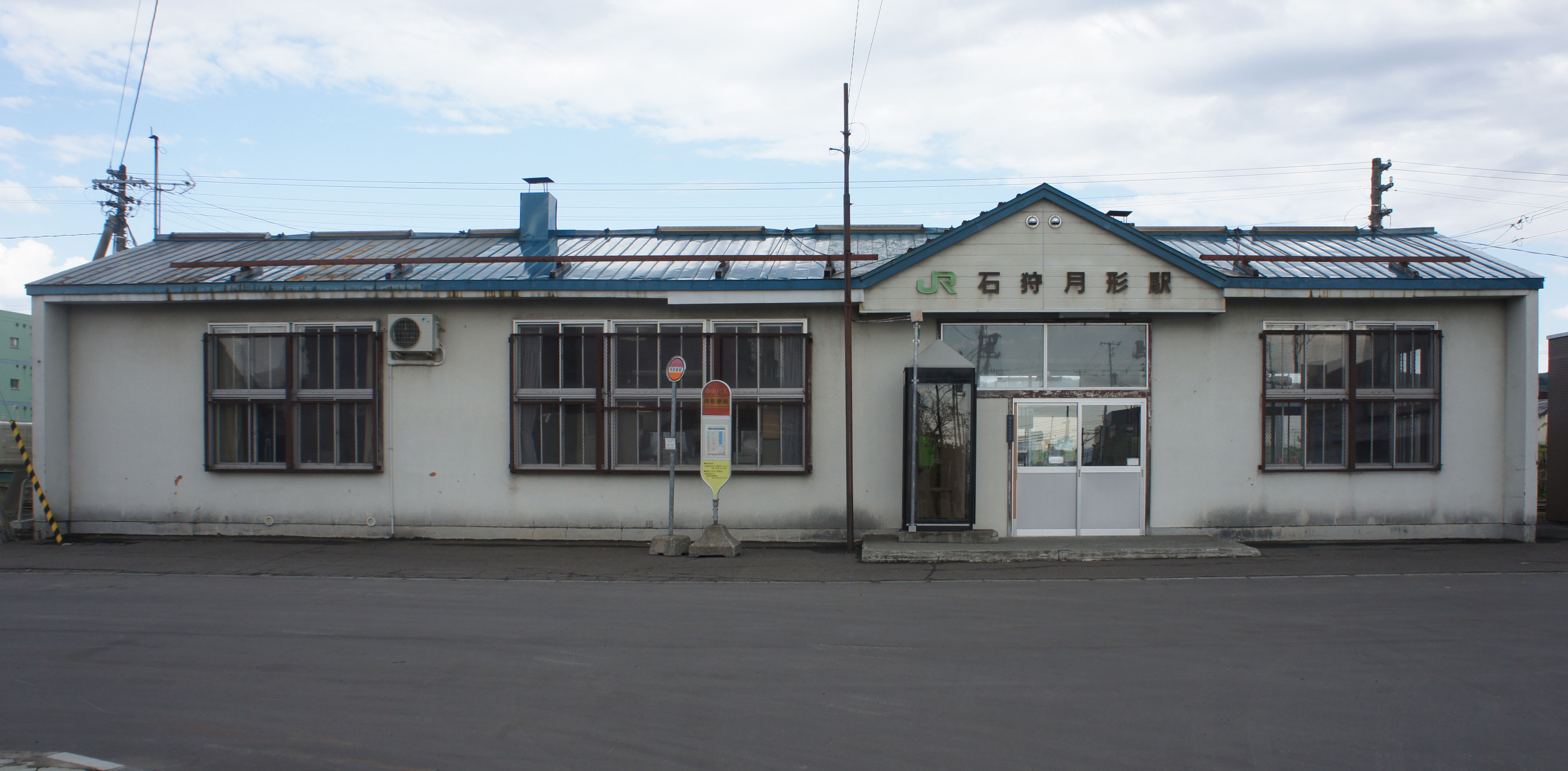
- Station building (May 2018)

General information
- Location: Japan
- Coordinates: 43.3405°N 141.6698°E
- Owner: JR Hokkaido
- Line: ■ Sasshō Line
- Distance: 46.3km from Sōen
- Platforms: 1
- Tracks: 2

History
- Opened: October 3, 1935
- Closed: April 17, 2020

Passengers
- 2013-2017: 79.0 average daily
Location

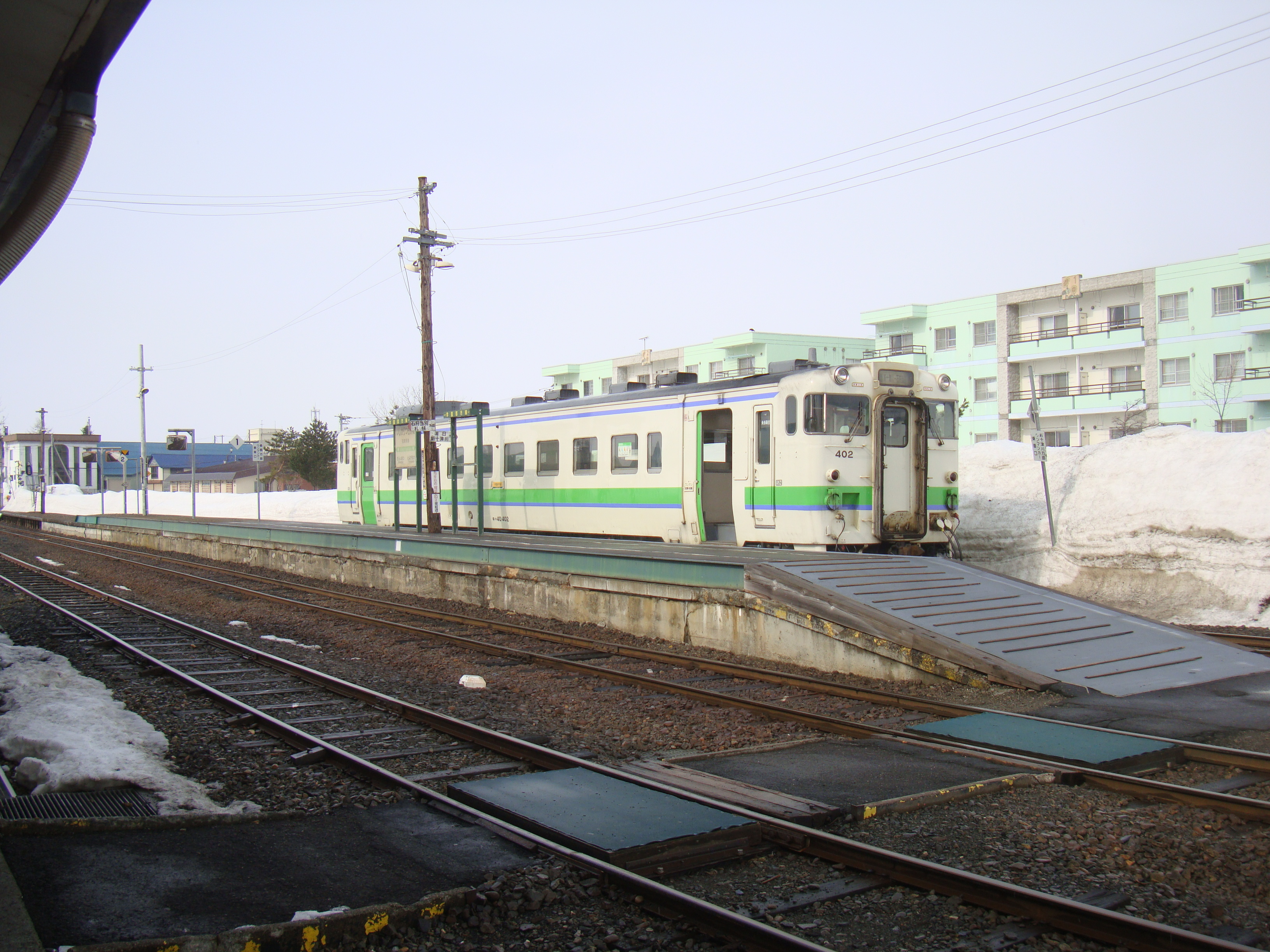
Station platform (April 2013)

Ishikari-Tsukigata Station (石狩月形駅, Ishikari-Tsukigata-eki) was a train station in Tsukigata, Kabato District, Hokkaidō, Japan.

== Lines ==
- Hokkaido Railway Company
  - Sasshō Line

== Station layout ==
The station had an island platform serving two tracks. A level crossing connected the platform and the station building, which was located to the northeast of the platform. There was also a third track.

== Adjacent stations ==
«	Service	»
Sasshō Line
Chiraiotsu	-	Toyogaoka

== History ==
The station opened on October 3, 1935.

In December 2018, it was announced that the station would be closed on May 7, 2020, along with the rest of the non-electrified section of the Sasshō Line. The actual last service was on April 17, 2020, amid the COVID-19 outbreak.
