= Satteki Station =

Railway station in Urausu, Hokkaido, Japan

Satteki Station 札的駅
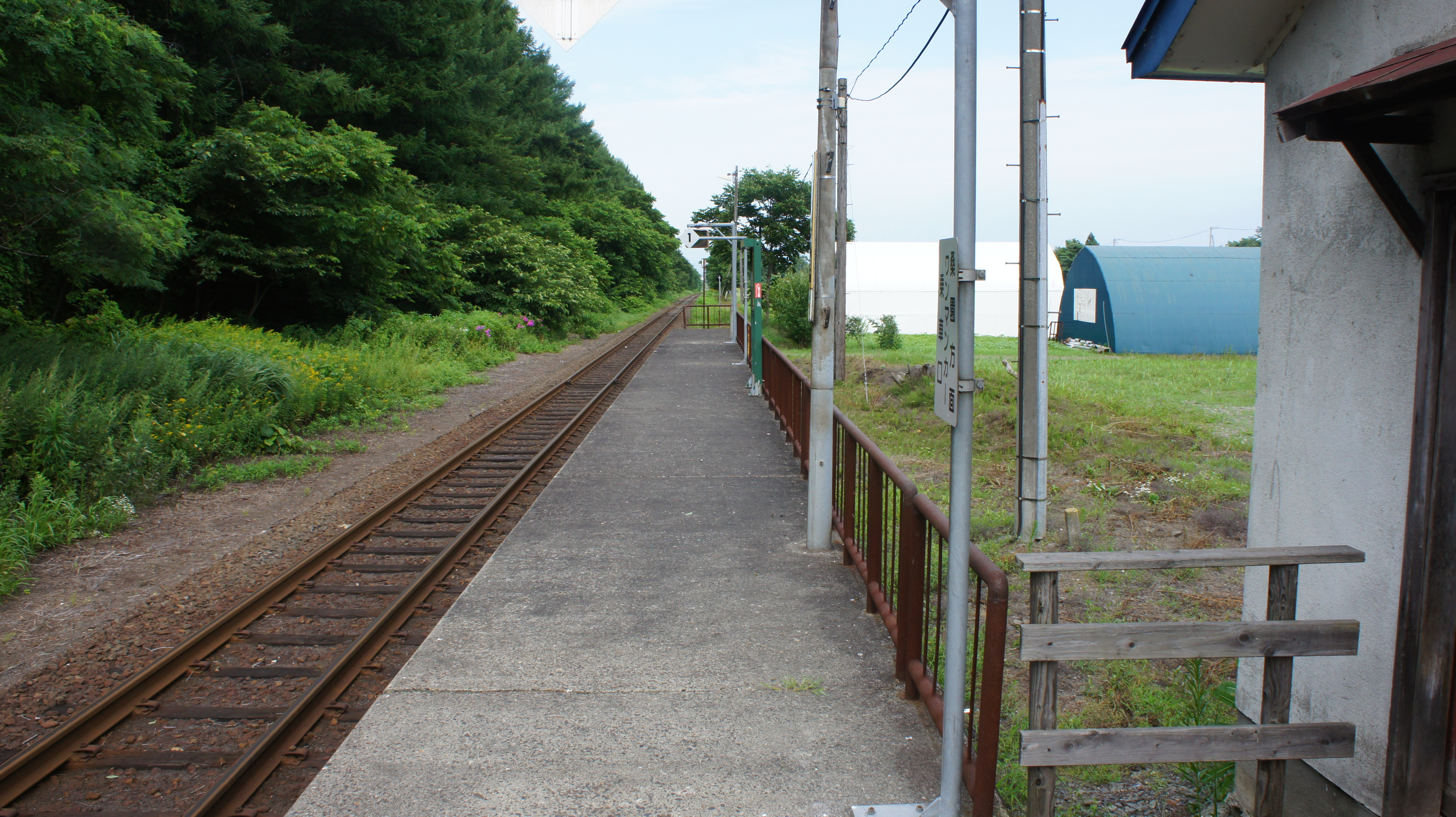
- Station platform (August 2017)

General information
- Location: Japan
- Coordinates: 43.4193°N 141.8043°E
- Owner: JR Hokkaido
- Line: ■ Sasshō Line
- Distance: 60.9km from Sōen
- Platforms: 1
- Tracks: 1

History
- Opened: 1 September 1960
- Closed: 17 April 2020

Passengers
- 2013-2017: 1.6 average daily
Location

Satteki Station (札的駅, Satteki-eki) is a train station in Urausu, Kabato District, Hokkaidō, Japan.

== Lines ==
- Hokkaido Railway Company
  - Sasshō Line

== Station layout ==
The station has a side platform serving one track. The unstaffed station building is located beside the platform.

== Adjacent stations ==
«	Service	»
Sasshō Line
Osokinai	-	Urausu

== History ==
The station opened on 1 September 1960.

In December 2018, it was announced that the station would be closed on May 7, 2020, along with the rest of the non-electrified section of the Sasshō Line, but the closed date was moved up to April 17 due to COVID-19 outbreak.
