= Mandokoro Shigesaburō =

- 政所 重三郎
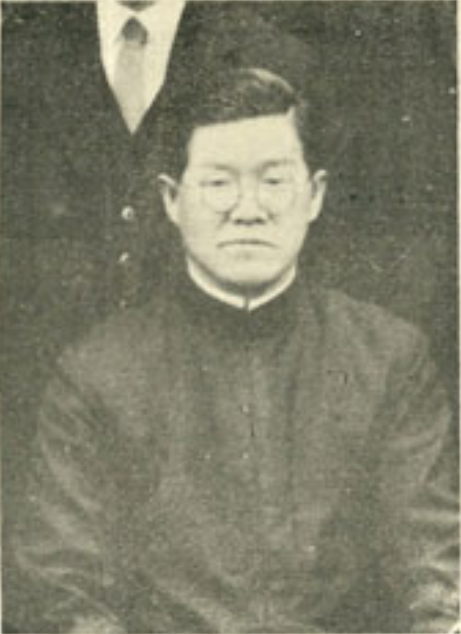

Personal details
- Born: February, 1884 Shintotsukawa, Hokkaido, Empire of Japan
- Died: Unknown

Mandokoro Shigesaburō (政所 重三郎; 1884-????) was a Japanese educator active in Japanese Taiwan. He was a bureaucrat in the Taiwan Governor-General's Office as well as head of the cities of Kagi, Shinchiku, and finally Karenkō Prefecture.

== Biography ==
Mandokoro Shigesaburō was born in February, 1884 in Shintotsukawa village, Kabato District, Hokkaido. He came from a tondenhei family.

Mandokoro graduated from Tokyo Higher Normal School in 1909 and received his teacher's certificate. He subsequently served on the teaching staff of the Aomori Prefectural Normal School, the Tochigi Prefectural Girls' High School, and the Ōkura Higher School of Commerce.

In October 1919, Mandokoro passed the advanced administration exam (高等文官試験).

After taking up employment in Japanese Taiwan, Mandokoro served on the Taichū Prefecture board of education among other posts. He retired in 1936.
