= Kusami Station =

Railway station in Kitakyushu, Japan

JF 07 Kusami Station 朽網駅
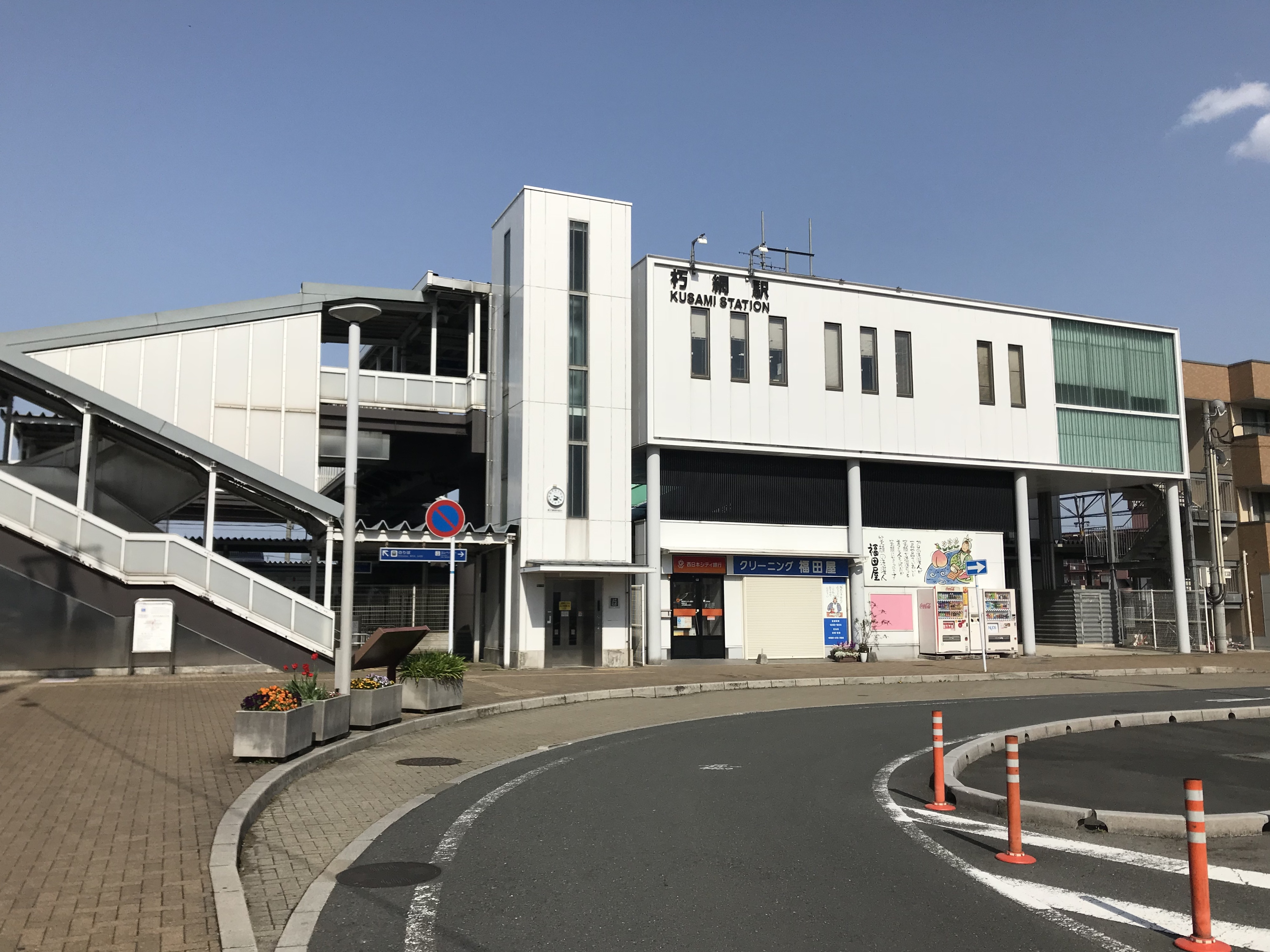
- Kusami Station in April 2018

General information
- Location: 1-1 Kusamihigashi, Kokuraminami-ku, Kitakyushu-shi, Fukuoka-ken 800-0232; Japan
- Coordinates: 33°48′26″N 130°57′18″E
- Operator: JR Kyushu
- Line: JF Nippō Main Line
- Distance: 15.0 km from Kokura
- Platforms: 2 side platforms

Construction
- Structure type: Elevated

Other information
- Status: Staffed
- Station code: JF07
- Website: Official website

History
- Opened: 1 June 1952

Passengers
- FY2020: 1822 daily

Services
Preceding station	JR Kyushu	Following station
Kanda towards Kagoshima	Nippō Main Line	Shimosone towards Kokura
Location
- Location within Fukuoka Prefecture Location within Japan

Kusami Station (朽網駅, Kusami-eki) is a passenger railway station located in Kokuraminami-ku, Kitakyushu, Fukuoka Prefecture, Japan. It is operated by JR Kyushu. It is the closest station for New Kitakyushu Airport.

== Lines ==
Kusami Station is served by the Nippō Main Line and is located 15.0 km from the starting point of the line at Kokura.

== Layout ==
The station consists of two opposed side platform, connected by an elevated station building. The station is staffed.

=== Platforms ===
1	■ JF Nippō Main Line	for Kokura
2	■ JF Nippō Main Line	for Yukuhashi and Nakatsu

== History ==
Kusami Station was established on 1 May 1952 as a signal stop and elevated to a full passenger station on 1 June 1952. The current station building was completed in 2005.

== Passenger statistics ==
In fiscal 2020, there was a daily average of 1822 boarding passengers at this station.

== Surrounding area ==
- Kitakyushu City Kutsuami Elementary School
- Kitakyushu City Higashi-Kutsuami Elementary School

== See also ==
- List of railway stations in Japan
