= Abeyama-kōen Station =

Railway station in Kitakyushu, Japan

JF 05 Abeyama-kōen Station 安部山公園駅
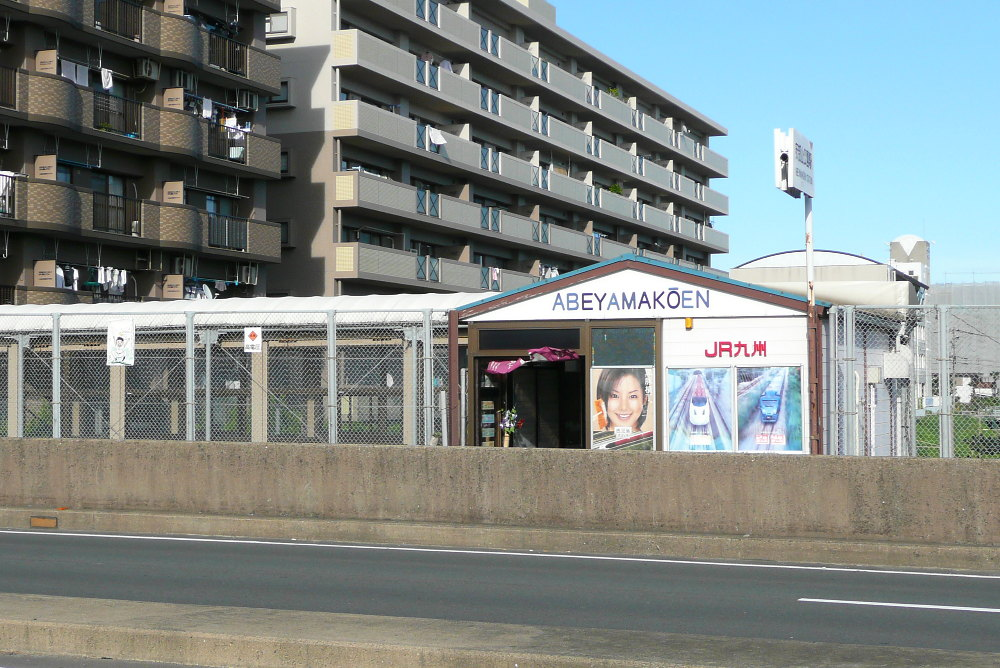
- Abeyama-kōen Station in August 2007

General information
- Location: 4 Yugawa-shinmachi, Kokuraminami-ku, Kitakyushu-shi, Fukuoka-ken 800-0256; Japan
- Coordinates: 33°50′39″N 130°54′15″E
- Operator: JR Kyushu
- Line: JF Nippō Main Line
- Platforms: 2 side platforms
- Tracks: 2

Construction
- Structure type: At grade

Other information
- Status: Staffed
- Station code: JF05
- Website: Official website

History
- Opened: 9 March 1987; 39 years ago

Passengers
- FY2021: 2071 daily (boarding only)

Services
Preceding station	JR Kyushu	Following station
Shimosone JF 06 towards Kagoshima	Nippō Main Line	Jōno JF 04 towards Kokura
Location
- Location within Fukuoka Prefecture Location within Kyushu Location within Japan

Abeyama-kōen Station (安部山公園駅, Abeyama-kōen-eki) is a passenger railway station located in Kokuraminami-ku, Kitakyushu, Fukuoka Prefecture, Japan, operated by Kyushu Railway Company (JR Kyushu).

== Lines ==
Abeyama-kōen Station is served by the Nippō Main Line and is located 8.4 km from the starting point of the line at Kokura. During the daytime, only "Local" all-stations services stop at this station, with four trains per hour in either direction.

== Layout ==
The station consists of two opposed side platforms, connected by a footbridge. The station is staffed.

=== Platforms ===
1	■ JF Nippō Main Line	for Kokura
2	■ JF Nippō Main Line	for Yukuhashi and Nakatsu

== History ==
Abeyama-kōen Station opened on 9 March 1987.

== Passenger statistics ==
In fiscal 2021, the station was used by an average of 2071 passengers daily.

== Surrounding area ==
- Abeyama Park
- Kitakyushu General Hospital
- Kitakyushu Yugawa Junior High School
- National Route 10

== See also ==
- List of railway stations in Japan
