= Shin-Totsukawa Station =

Railway station in Shintotsukawa, Hokkaido, Japan

Shin Totsukawa Station 新十津川駅
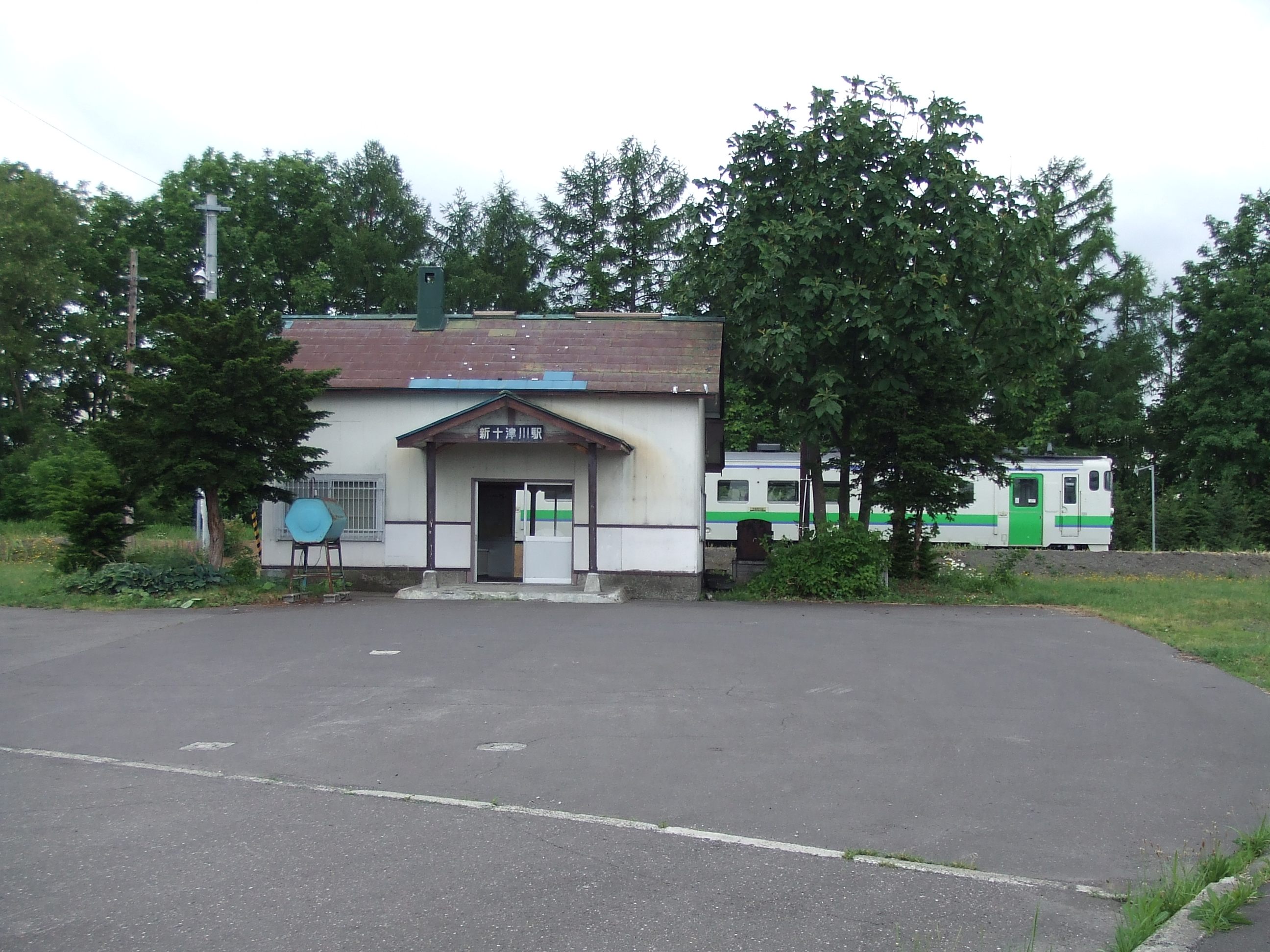
- Station building (June 2007)

General information
- Location: Japan
- Coordinates: 43°32′45″N 141°52′27″E
- Owner: JR Hokkaido
- Line: ■ Sasshō Line
- Distance: 76.5km from Sōen
- Platforms: 1
- Tracks: 1

History
- Opened: 10 October 1931
- Closed: 17 April 2020

Passengers
- 2013-2017: 8.4 average daily
Location

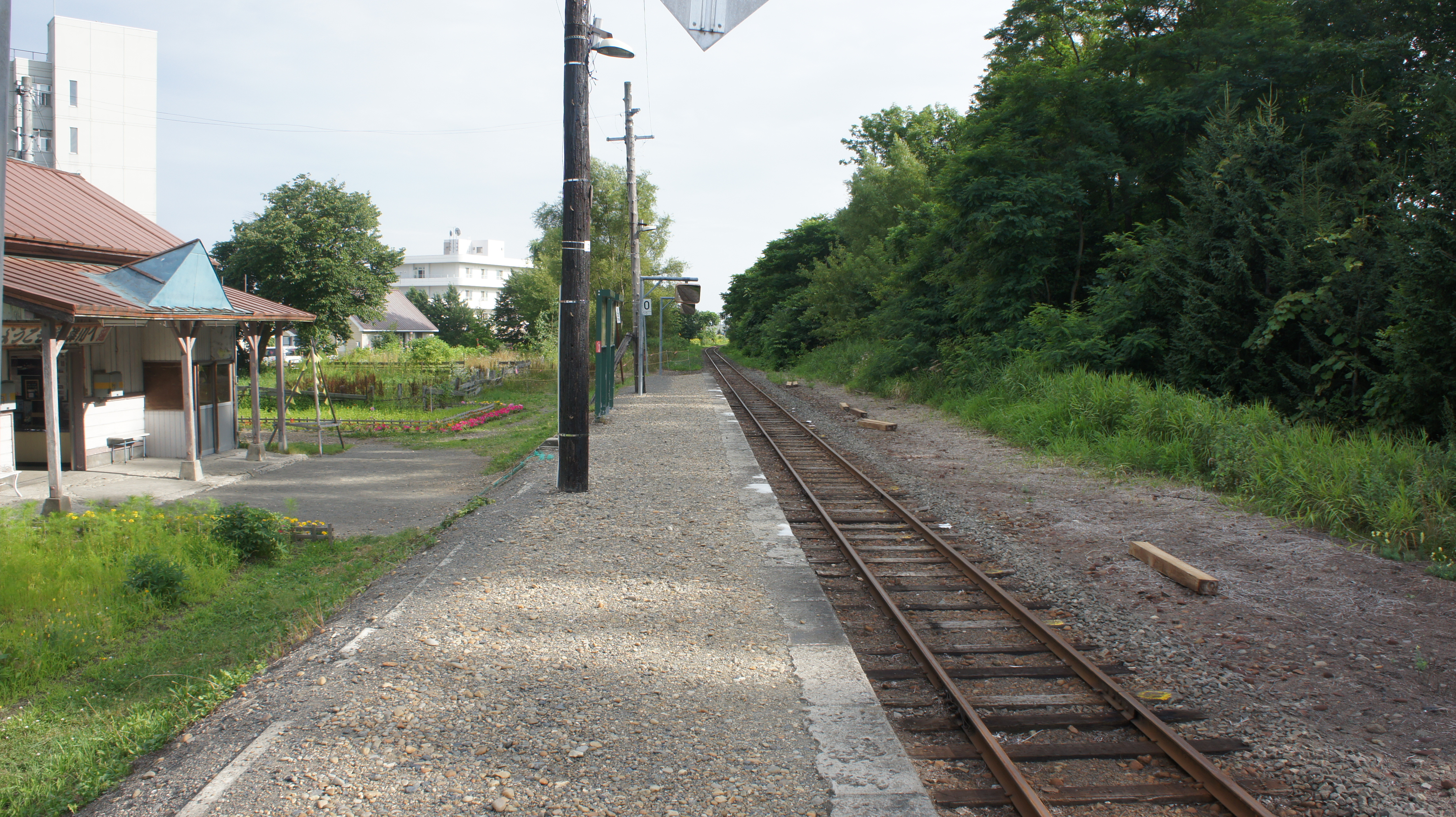
Station platform (August 2017)

Shin-Totsukawa Station (新十津川駅, Shin-Totsukawa-eki) was a railway station on the Sasshō Line in Shintotsukawa, Hokkaidō, Japan, operated by the Hokkaido Railway Company (JR Hokkaido).

== Lines ==
Shin-Totsukawa Station was the old terminus of the Sasshō Line from Sapporo, and is situated 76.5 km from the official starting point of the line at Sōen.

== Station layout ==
The station had a side platform serving one track. The station building was located next to the platform.

== Adjacent stations ==
«	Service	»
Sasshō Line
Shimo-Toppu	-	Terminus

== History ==
The station opened on 10 October 1931.

In December 2018, it was announced that the station would be closed on May 7, 2020, along with the rest of the non-electrified section of the Sasshō Line. The actual last service was on April 17, 2020, amid the COVID-19 outbreak.

== See also ==
- List of railway stations in Japan
