= Shimo-Toppu Station =

Railway station in Shintotsukawa, Hokkaido, Japan

Shimo-Toppu Station 下徳富駅
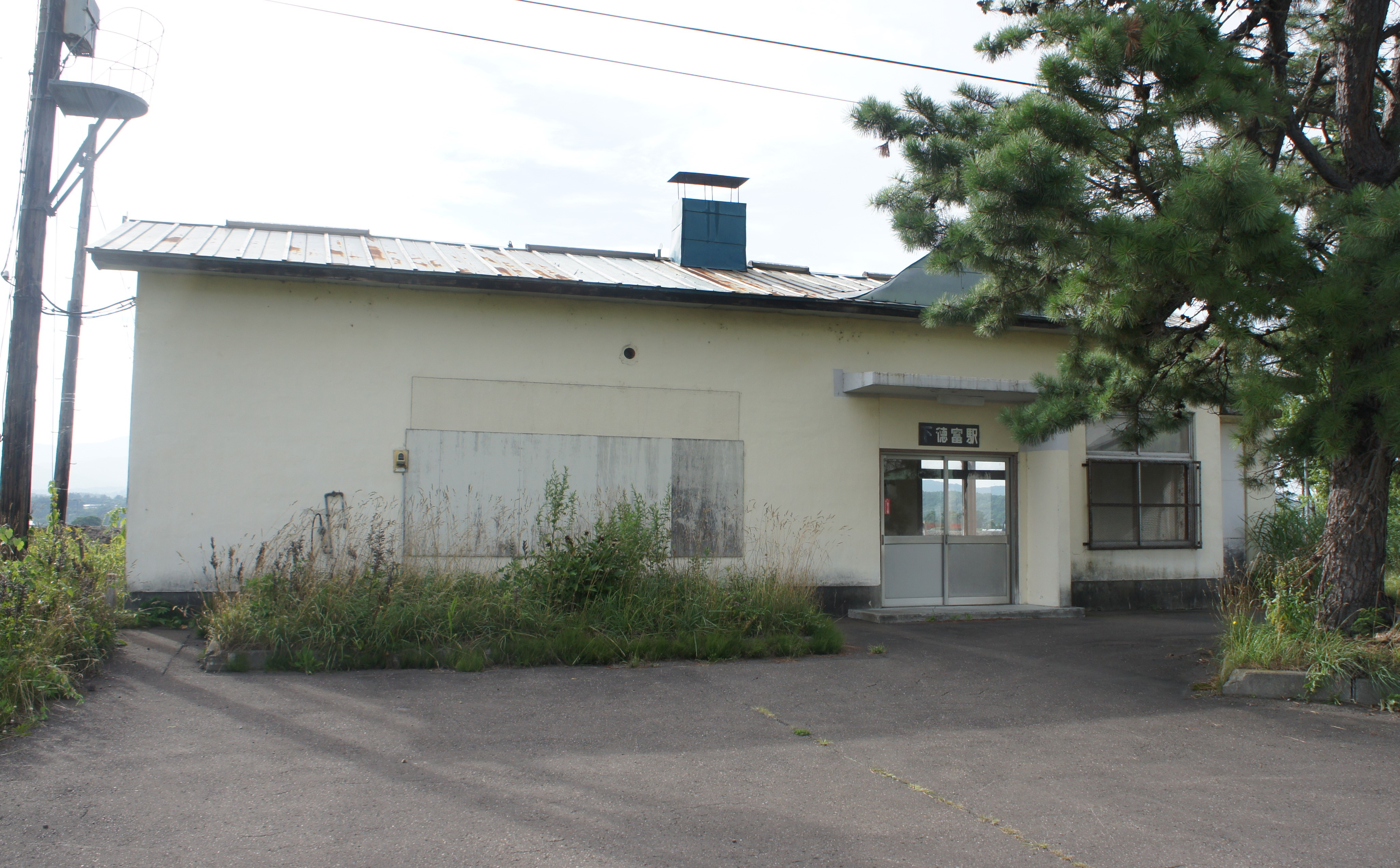
- Station building (August 2017)

General information
- Location: Japan
- Coordinates: 43.5024°N 141.8556°E
- Owner: JR Hokkaido
- Line: ■ Sasshō Line
- Distance: 71.5km from Sōen
- Platforms: 1
- Tracks: 1

History
- Opened: 10 October 1931
- Closed: 17 April 2020

Passengers
- 2013-2017: 0.6 average daily
Location

Shimo-Toppu Station (下徳富駅, Shimo-Toppu-eki) was a railway station on the Sasshō Line in Shintotsukawa, Hokkaidō, Japan, operated by the Hokkaido Railway Company (JR Hokkaido).

== Lines ==
- Hokkaido Railway Company
  - Sasshō Line

== Station layout ==
The station had a side platform serving one track. The station building is located next to the platform.

== Adjacent stations ==
«	Service	»
Sasshō Line
Minami-Shimo-Toppu	-	Shin-Totsukawa

== History ==
The station opened on 10 October 1934.

In December 2018, it was announced that the station would be closed on May 7, 2020, along with the rest of the non-electrified section of the Sasshō Line. The actual last service was on April 17, 2020 amid the COVID-19 outbreak.
