= Minami-Shimo-Toppu Station =

Railway station in Shintotsukawa, Hokkaido, Japan

Minami-Shimo-Toppu Station 南下徳富駅
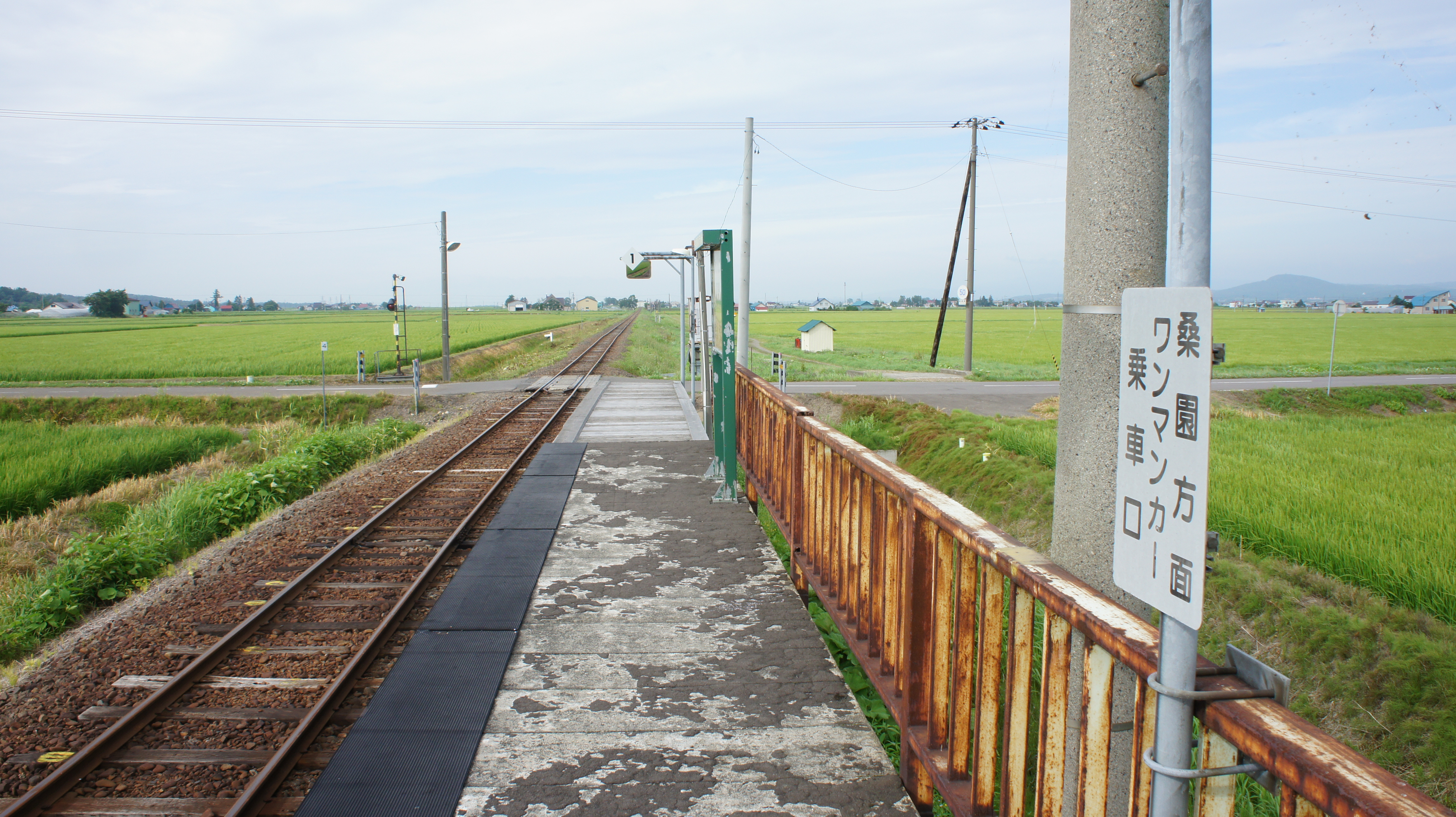
- Station platform (August 2017)

General information
- Location: Japan
- Coordinates: 43.4858°N 141.8445°E
- Owner: JR Hokkaido
- Line: ■ Sasshō Line
- Distance: 69.4km from Sōen
- Platforms: 1
- Tracks: 1

History
- Opened: 16 November 1956
- Closed: 17 April 2020

Passengers
- 2013-2017: 0.2 average daily
Location

Minami-Shimo-Toppu Station (南下徳富駅, Minami-Shimo-Toppu-eki) was a railway station on the Sasshō Line in Shintotsukawa, Hokkaidō, Japan, operated by the Hokkaido Railway Company (JR Hokkaido).

== Lines ==
- Hokkaido Railway Company
  - Sasshō Line

== Station layout ==
The station had a side platform serving one track. There is no station building or shelter.

== Adjacent stations ==
«	Service	»
Sasshō Line
Osatsunai	-	Shimo-Toppu

== History ==
The station opened on 11 November 1956.

In December 2018, it was announced that the station would be closed on May 7, 2020, along with the rest of the non-electrified section of the Sasshō Line. The actual last service was on April 17, 2020 amid the COVID-19 outbreak.
