= Shimosone Station =

Railway station in Kitakyushu, Japan

JF 06 Shimosone Station 下曽根駅
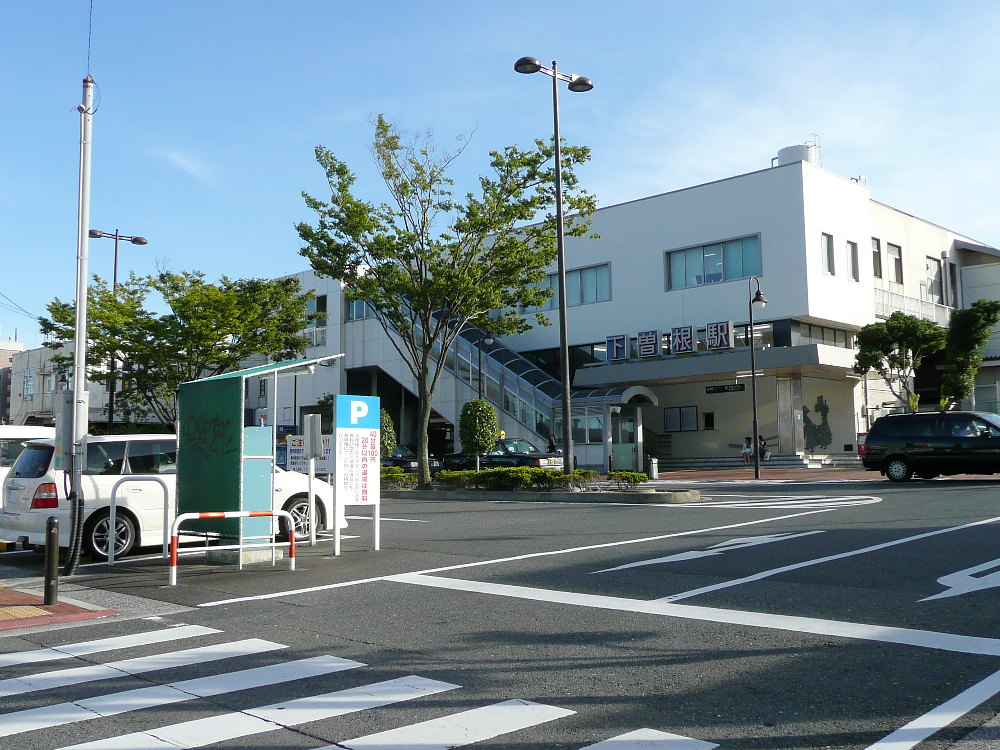
- Shimosone Station north entrance in August 2007

General information
- Location: 1-chōme-8 Shimosone, Kokuraminami-ku, Kitakyushu-shi, Fukuoka-ken 800-0217; Japan
- Coordinates: 33°49′57″N 130°56′05″E
- Operator: JR Kyushu
- Line: JF Nippō Main Line
- Distance: 11.6 km from Kokura
- Platforms: 1 island platform

Construction
- Structure type: Elevated

Other information
- Status: Staffed
- Station code: JF06
- Website: Official website

History
- Opened: 25 October 1895
- Former names: Sone (to 1945)

Passengers
- FY2020: 5339 daily

Services
Preceding station	JR Kyushu	Following station
Kusami towards Kagoshima	Nippō Main Line	Abeyamakōen towards Kokura
Location
- Location within Fukuoka Prefecture Location within Japan

Shimosone Station (下曽根駅, Shimosone-eki) is a passenger railway station located in Kokuraminami-ku, Kitakyushu, Fukuoka Prefecture, Japan. It is operated by JR Kyushu.

== Lines ==
Shimosone Station is served by the Nippō Main Line and is located 11.6 km from the starting point of the line at Kokura.

== Layout ==
The station consists of one island platform, connected by an elevated station building. The station is staffed.

=== Platforms ===
1	■ JF Nippō Main Line	for Yukuhashi and Nakatsu
2	■ JF Nippō Main Line	for Kokura

== History ==
Shimosone Station was established as Sone Station (曽根駅; *) on 25 October 1895 as on the Kyushu Railway. The railway was nationalized in 1907. The station was renamed to its current name on 1 May 1945. On 4 May 1946, the station was destroyed by an explosion at the neighboring former Imperial Japanese Army Air Service Fukuoka HQ. The current station building was completed in 1981. With the privatization of the JNR on 1 April 197, the station came under JR Kyushu.

== Passenger statistics ==
In fiscal 2020, there was a daily average of 5339 boarding passengers at this station.。

== See also ==
- List of railway stations in Japan
