= Tsukigata, Hokkaido =

Tsukigata 月形町
- Town
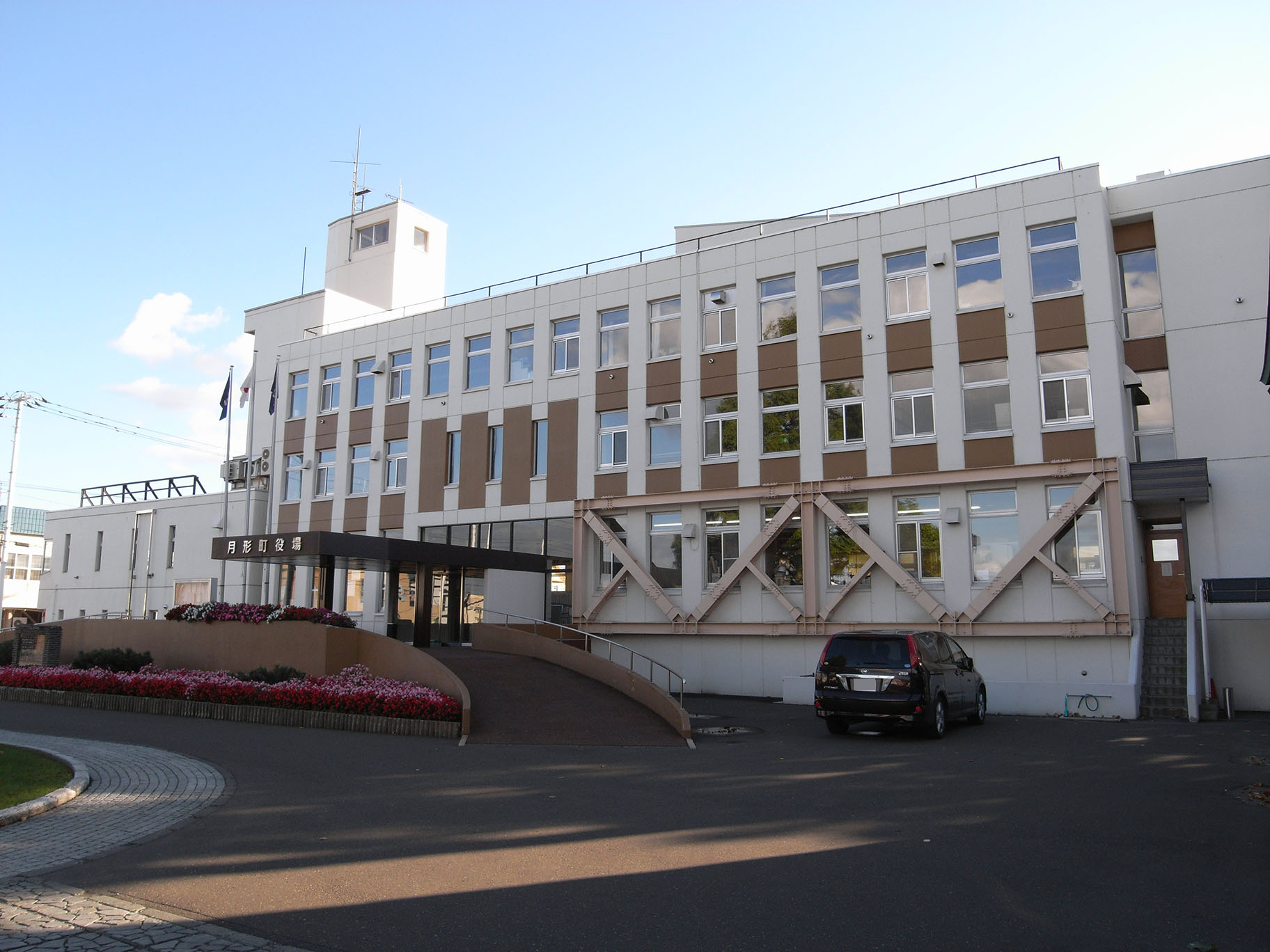
- Tsukigata town hall

- Flag Seal

- Location of Tsukigata in Hokkaido (Sorachi Subprefecture)

- Location in Japan
- Coordinates: 43°20′N 141°40′E
- Country: Japan
- Region: Hokkaido
- Prefecture: Hokkaido (Sorachi Subprefecture)
- District: Kabato

Area
  - Total: 151.05 km^{2} (58.32 sq mi)

Population (September 30, 2016)
  - Total: 3,429
  - Density: 22.70/km^{2} (58.80/sq mi)
- Time zone: UTC+09:00 (JST)
- Climate: Dfb
- Website: www.town.tsukigata.hokkaido.jp

Tsukigata (月形町, Tsukigata-chō) is a town in Sorachi Subprefecture, Hokkaido, Japan.

As of September 2016 it had an estimated population of 3,429. The total area is 151.05 km^{2}.

In 1881 Kabato Prison and Tsukigata village were established. The prison was open until 1919, during which time 1,046 prisoners died while incarcerated.

== Climate ==
Climate data for Tsukigata (1991−2020 normals, extremes 1977−present)
Month	Jan	Feb	Mar	Apr	May	Jun	Jul	Aug	Sep	Oct	Nov	Dec	Year
Record high °C (°F)	6.2 (43.2)	8.1 (46.6)	14.1 (57.4)	24.2 (75.6)	33.0 (91.4)	33.6 (92.5)	36.3 (97.3)	36.0 (96.8)	32.1 (89.8)	25.3 (77.5)	19.5 (67.1)	12.6 (54.7)	36.3 (97.3)
Mean daily maximum °C (°F)	−2.2 (28.0)	−1.1 (30.0)	2.9 (37.2)	9.9 (49.8)	16.9 (62.4)	21.1 (70.0)	24.6 (76.3)	25.6 (78.1)	22.1 (71.8)	15.3 (59.5)	7.1 (44.8)	0.1 (32.2)	11.9 (53.3)
Daily mean °C (°F)	−6.0 (21.2)	−5.3 (22.5)	−1.3 (29.7)	4.7 (40.5)	11.1 (52.0)	15.6 (60.1)	19.6 (67.3)	20.7 (69.3)	16.5 (61.7)	9.9 (49.8)	3.1 (37.6)	−3.2 (26.2)	7.1 (44.8)
Mean daily minimum °C (°F)	−10.8 (12.6)	−10.7 (12.7)	−6.2 (20.8)	−0.4 (31.3)	5.6 (42.1)	11.1 (52.0)	15.8 (60.4)	16.8 (62.2)	11.6 (52.9)	4.7 (40.5)	−0.9 (30.4)	−7.2 (19.0)	2.5 (36.4)
Record low °C (°F)	−23.7 (−10.7)	−25.6 (−14.1)	−22.8 (−9.0)	−12.0 (10.4)	−2.6 (27.3)	1.8 (35.2)	6.1 (43.0)	7.3 (45.1)	1.7 (35.1)	−4.0 (24.8)	−13.6 (7.5)	−23.7 (−10.7)	−25.6 (−14.1)
Average precipitation mm (inches)	139.1 (5.48)	96.4 (3.80)	68.5 (2.70)	60.1 (2.37)	88.5 (3.48)	71.7 (2.82)	122.8 (4.83)	157.7 (6.21)	145.7 (5.74)	140.7 (5.54)	159.4 (6.28)	166.2 (6.54)	1,416.6 (55.77)
Average precipitation days (≥ 1.0 mm)	22.9	18.6	15.7	11.4	11.1	8.9	10.0	10.6	12.5	16.1	20.7	23.8	182.3
Mean monthly sunshine hours	57.3	73.7	129.5	173.8	196.3	167.7	146.4	152.1	155.4	129.1	68.0	39.7	1,473.5
Source: Japan Meteorological Agency
