= Urausu, Hokkaido =

Urausu 浦臼町
- Town
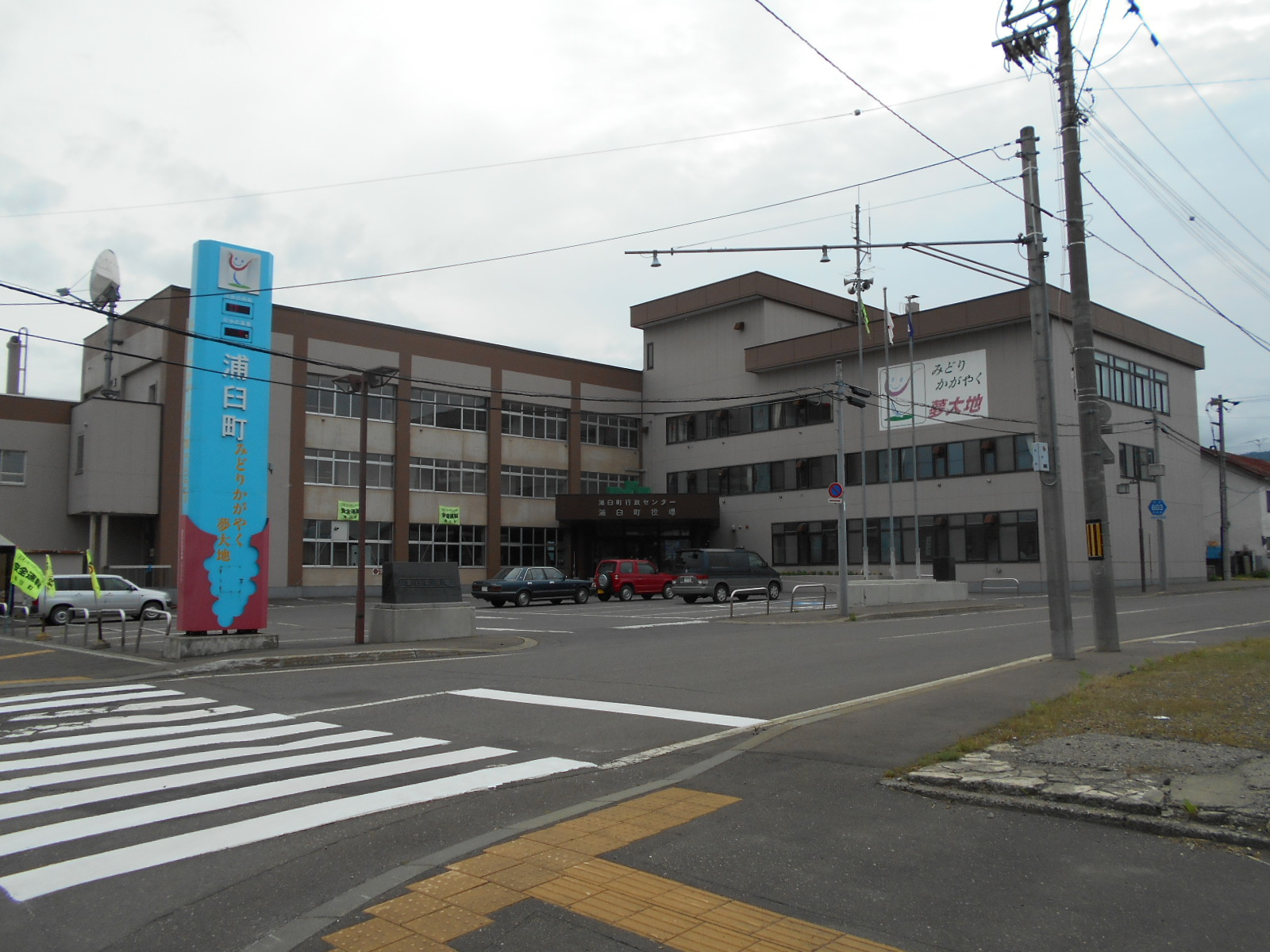
- Urausu town office

- Flag Seal

- Location of Urausu in Hokkaido (Sorachi Subprefecture)

- Location in Japan
- Coordinates: 43°26′N 141°49′E
- Country: Japan
- Region: Hokkaido
- Prefecture: Hokkaido (Sorachi Subprefecture)
- District: Kabato

Area
  - Total: 101.08 km^{2} (39.03 sq mi)

Population (September 30, 2016)
  - Total: 1,983
  - Density: 19.62/km^{2} (50.81/sq mi)
- Time zone: UTC+09:00 (JST)
- Website: www.town.urausu.hokkaido.jp

Urausu (浦臼町, Urausu-chō) is a town located in Sorachi Subprefecture, Hokkaido, Japan.

As of September 2016, the town has an estimated population of 1,983, and a density of 19.5 persons per km^{2}. The total area is 101.08 km^{2}.

== Culture ==
=== Mascot ===
Usuko Ne-san, the town's mascot

Urausu's mascot is Usuko Ne-san (臼子ねぇさん). She is a wine barrel. Due to this, she wears make up to hide cracks. She is known for saying "my blood is flowing with wine!" (私の血はワインが流れている！). She is usually assisted by U-chan (う～ちゃん, U ~-chan) and Urapai (ウラパイ).
