= Kabato District, Hokkaido =

District in Hokkaido, Japan

Coordinates: 43.576°N 141.754°E

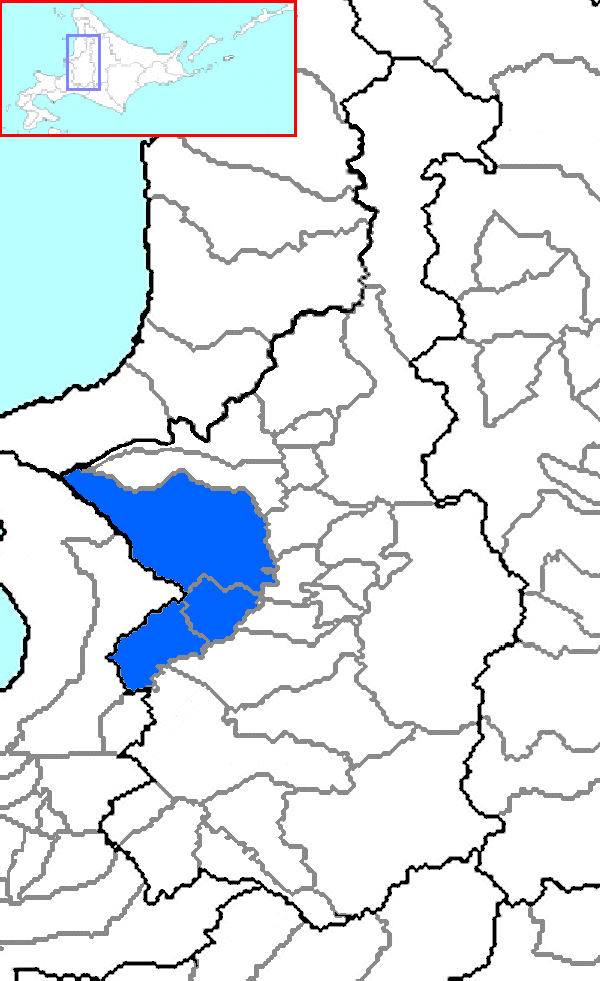
Kabato District in Sorachi Subprefecture

Kabato (樺戸郡, Kabato-gun) is a district located in Sorachi Subprefecture, Hokkaido, Japan.

As of 2004, the district has an estimated population of 14,944 and a density of 19.99 persons per km^{2}. The total area is 747.75 km^{2}.

There is a local museum, the Tsukigata Kabato Museum, which was a former prison.

== Towns and villages ==
- Shintotsukawa
- Tsukigata
- Urausu

== Geology ==
Cretaceous era and Neogene andesite dykes are documented in the area, representing channels of volcanic rock that solidified.
