= List of Sapporo Municipal Subway station =

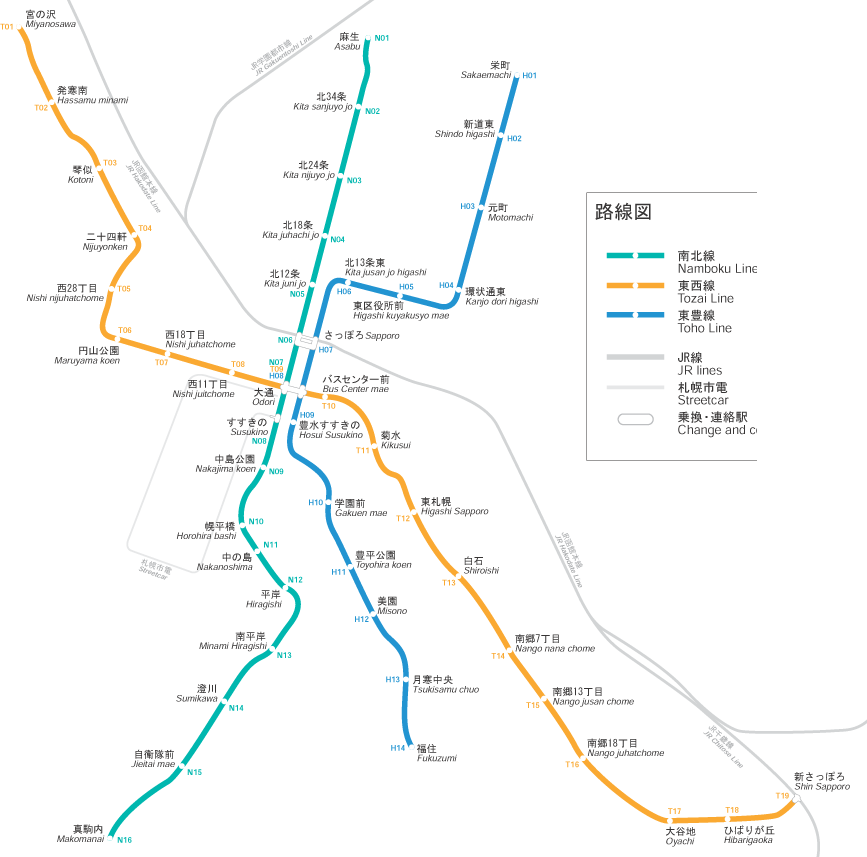
Sapporo Municipal Subway network map

There are currently 46 stations on the Sapporo Municipal Subway network operated by the Sapporo City Transportation Bureau. The first section to open was the Namboku Line, which began operation in December 1971 between Kita-Nijūyo-Jō station and Hiragishi Station.

As of 2025, the network extends 48.0 km (29.8 mi) and serves all 10 wards in the city of Sapporo, excluding Kiyota.

== Stations ==
=== Namboku Line ===
No	Station	Japanese	Distance (km)		Transfers	Location
No	Station	Japanese	Between stations	Total	Transfers	Location
N01	Asabu	麻生	-	0.0	Sasshō Line ( G05 Shin-Kotoni)	Kita-ku
N02	Kita-Sanjūyo-Jō	北34条	1.0	1.0		Kita-ku
N03	Kita-Nijūyo-Jō	北24条	1.2	2.2		Kita-ku
N04	Kita-Jūhachi-Jō	北18条	0.9	3.1		Kita-ku
N05	Kita-Jūni-Jō	北12条	0.8	3.9		Kita-ku
N06	Sapporo	さっぽろ	1.0	4.9	Tōhō Line ( H07 ) Hakodate Main Line( 01 )	Chūō-ku
N07	Ōdōri	大通	0.6	5.5	Tōzai Line ( T09 ) Tōhō Line ( H08 ) Sapporo Streetcar (Nishi-Yon-Chōme)	Chūō-ku
N08	Susukino	すすきの	0.6	6.1	Sapporo Streetcar	Chūō-ku
N09	Nakajima-Kōen	中島公園	0.7	6.8	Sapporo Streetcar (Yamahana-Ku-Jō)	Chūō-ku
N10	Horohira-Bashi	幌平橋	1.0	7.8	Sapporo Streetcar (Seishūgakuen-Mae)	Chūō-ku
N11	Nakanoshima	中の島	0.5	8.3		Toyohira-ku
N12	Hiragishi	平岸	0.7	9.0		Toyohira-ku
N13	Minami-Hiragishi	南平岸	1.1	10.1		Toyohira-ku
N14	Sumikawa	澄川	1.2	11.3		Minami-ku
N15	Jieitai-Mae	自衛隊前	1.3	12.6		Minami-ku
N16	Makomanai	真駒内	1.7	14.3		Minami-ku

=== Tozai Line ===
No.	Station	Japanese	Distance (km)		Transfers	Location
No.	Station	Japanese	Between stations	Total	Transfers	Location
T01	Miyanosawa	宮の沢	-	0.0		Nishi-ku
T02	Hassamu-Minami	発寒南	1.5	1.5		Nishi-ku
T03	Kotoni	琴似	1.3	2.8		Nishi-ku
T04	Nijūyon-Ken	二十四軒	0.9	3.7		Nishi-ku
T05	Nishi-Nijūhatchōme	西28丁目	1.2	4.9		Chūō-ku
T06	Maruyama-Kōen	円山公園	0.8	5.7		Chūō-ku
T07	Nishi-Jūhatchōme	西18丁目	0.9	6.6	Sapporo Streetcar (Nishi-Jūgo-Chōme)	Chūō-ku
T08	Nishi-Jūitchōme	西11丁目	0.9	7.5	Sapporo Streetcar (Chūō-Kuyakusho-Mae)	Chūō-ku
T09	Ōdōri	大通	1.0	8.5	Namboku Line ( N07 ) Tōhō Line( H08 ) Sapporo Streetcar (Nishi-Yon-Chōme)	Chūō-ku
T10	Bus Center-Mae	バスセンター前	0.8	9.3		Chūō-ku
T11	Kikusui	菊水	1.1	10.4		Shiroishi-ku
T12	Higashi-Sapporo	東札幌	1.2	11.6		Shiroishi-ku
T13	Shiroishi	白石	1.1	12.7		Shiroishi-ku
T14	Nangō-Nana-Chōme	南郷7丁目	1.4	14.1		Shiroishi-ku
T15	Nangō-Jūsan-Chōme	南郷13丁目	1.1	15.2		Shiroishi-ku
T16	Nangō-Jūhatchōme	南郷18丁目	1.2	16.4		Shiroishi-ku
T17	Ōyachi	大谷地	1.5	17.9		Atsubetsu-ku
T18	Hibarigaoka	ひばりが丘	1.0	18.9		Atsubetsu-ku
T19	Shin-Sapporo	新さっぽろ	1.2	20.1	Chitose Line ( H05 )	Atsubetsu-ku

=== Toho Line ===
No.	Station	Japanese	Distance (km)		Transfers	Location
No.	Station	Japanese	Between stations	Total	Transfers	Location
H01	Sakaemachi	栄町	-	0.0		Higashi-ku
H02	Shindō-Higashi	新道東	0.9	0.9		Higashi-ku
H03	Motomachi	元町	1.2	2.1		Higashi-ku
H04	Kanjō-Dōri-Higashi	環状通東	1.4	3.5		Higashi-ku
H05	Higashi-Kuyakusho-Mae	東区役所前	1.0	4.5		Higashi-ku
H06	Kita-Jūsan-Jō-Higashi	北13条東	0.9	5.4		Higashi-ku
H07	Sapporo	さっぽろ	1.3	6.7	Namboku Line ( N06 ) Hakodate Main Line ( 01 )	Chūō-ku
H08	Ōdōri	大通	0.6	7.3	Namboku Line ( N07 ) Tōzai Line ( T09 ) Sapporo Streetcar (Nishi-Yon-Chōme)	Chūō-ku
H09	Hōsui-Susukino	豊水すすきの	0.8	8.1	Sapporo Streetcar (Susukino)	Chūō-ku
H10	Gakuen-Mae	学園前	1.4	9.5		Toyohira-ku
H11	Toyohira-Kōen	豊平公園	0.9	10.4		Toyohira-ku
H12	Misono	美園	1.0	11.4		Toyohira-ku
H13	Tsukisamu-Chūō	月寒中央	1.2	12.6		Toyohira-ku
H14	Fukuzumi	福住	1.0	13.6		Toyohira-ku
