= Horohira-Bashi Station =

Subway station in Sapporo, Japan

Coordinates: 43°2′22.405″N 141°21′17.97″E

N10 Horohira-Bashi Station 幌平橋駅
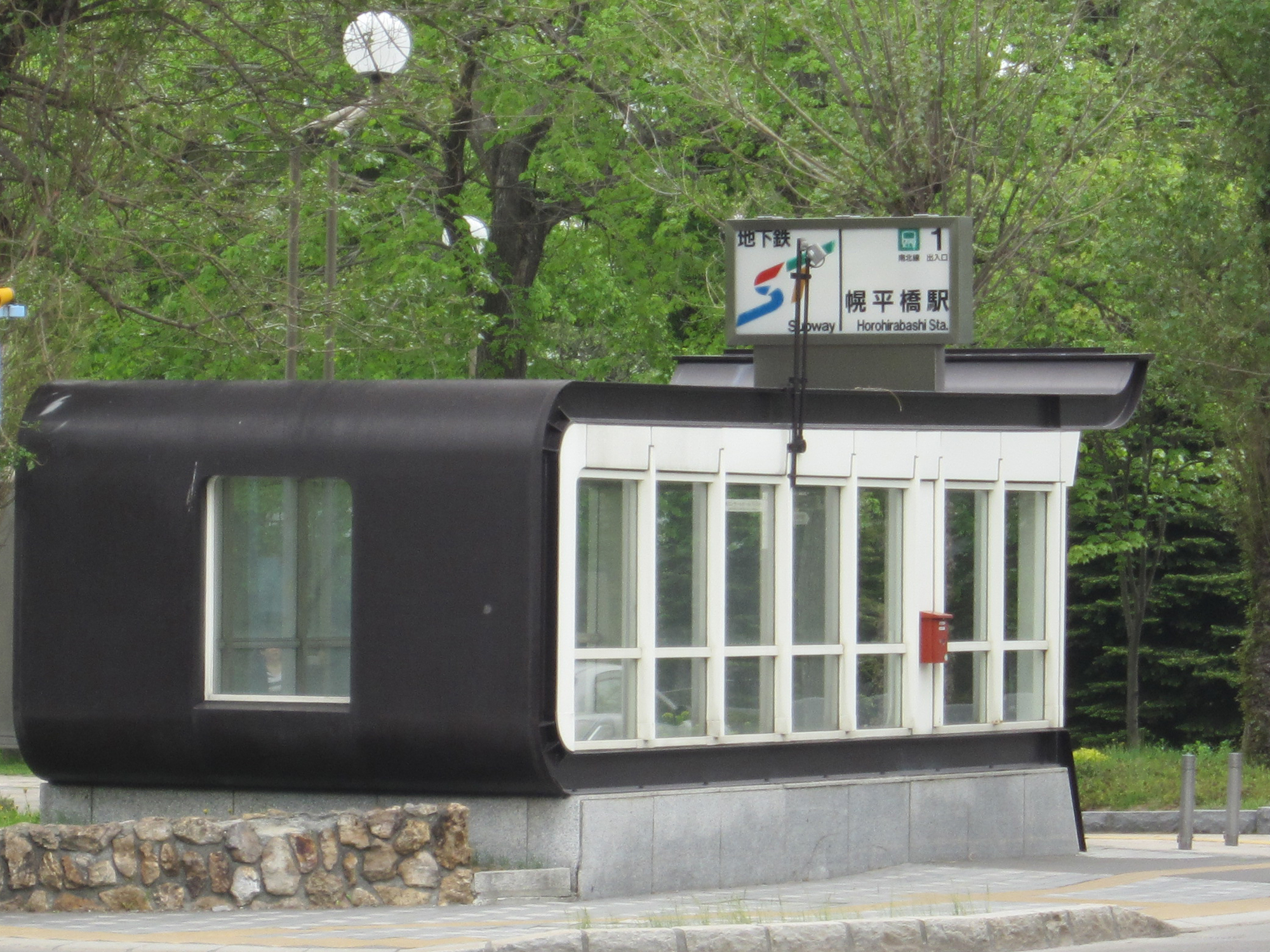
- Station exit 1

General information
- Location: Chūō, Sapporo, Hokkaido; Japan
- System: Sapporo Municipal Subway station
- Operator: Sapporo City Transportation Bureau
- Line: Namboku Line

Construction
- Accessible: Yes

Other information
- Station code: N10

History
- Opened: 16 December 1971; 54 years ago

Services
Preceding station	Sapporo Municipal Subway	Following station
Nakajima-Kōen N09 towards Asabu	Namboku Line	Nakanoshima N11 towards Makomanai
Location
- Location within Hokkaido Location within Japan

Horohira-Bashi Station (幌平橋駅) is a Sapporo Municipal Subway station in Chūō-ku, Sapporo, Hokkaido, Japan. The station number is N10.

== Platforms ==
1	■ Namboku Line	for Makomanai
2	■ Namboku Line	for Asabu

== History ==
The station opened on 16 December 1971 coinciding with the opening of the Namboku Line from Makomanai Station to Kita-Nijuyo-Jo Station.

== Surrounding area ==
- Seishūgakuen-Mae Station, Sapporo Streetcar
- Nakajima Park
- Gokoku Shrine
- Minami Jūyo-Jō Post Office
- Minami Nakajima Police Station
- Hokkaido Bank, Nakajima branch
