= Kita-Jūni-Jō Station =

Subway station in Sapporo, Japan

Coordinates: 43°4′28.459″N 141°20′53.874″E

N05 Kita-Jūni-Jō Station 北12条駅
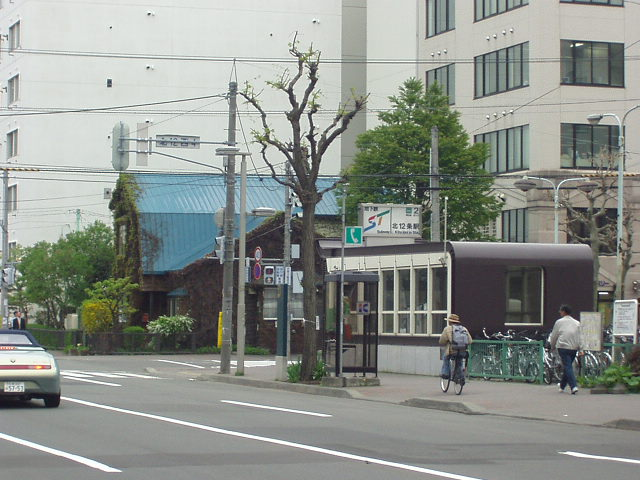
- Station exit

General information
- Location: Kita, Sapporo, Hokkaido; Japan
- System: Sapporo Municipal Subway station
- Operator: Sapporo City Transportation Bureau
- Line: Namboku Line

Construction
- Accessible: Yes

Other information
- Station code: N05

History
- Opened: December 16, 1971; 54 years ago

Passengers
- FY2014 (Daily): 4,737

Services
| Preceding station | Sapporo Municipal Subway | Following station |
|---|---|---|
| Kita-Jūhachi-Jō N04 towards Asabu | Namboku Line | Sapporo N06 towards Makomanai |
Location
- Location within Hokkaido Location within Japan

Kita-Jūni-Jō Station (Japanese: 北12条駅; lit. '"North 12th Street Station"') is a Sapporo Municipal Subway station in Kita-ku, Sapporo, Hokkaido, Japan. The station number is N05.

== Platforms ==
| 1 | ■ Namboku Line | for Makomanai |
| 2 | ■ Namboku Line | for Asabu |

== History ==
The station opened on 16 December 1971 coinciding with the opening of the Namboku Line from Makomanai Station to Kita-Nijuyo-Jo Station.

== Surrounding area ==
- Japan National Route 5, (to Hakodate)
- Kita Ward Tetsunishi Community Development center
- Sapporo Kita-Jūni-Jō Post Office
- Kita-Higashi, Central Police Station
- Hokkaido University, Faculty of Medicine
- Hokkaido University Hospital
- Sapporo Masjid (Mosque). A first mosque in Sapporo and Hokkaido Prefecture.
