= Minami-Hiragishi Station =

Subway station in Sapporo, Japan

Coordinates: 43°1′36.720″N 141°22′18.12″E

N13 Minami-Hiragishi Station 南平岸駅
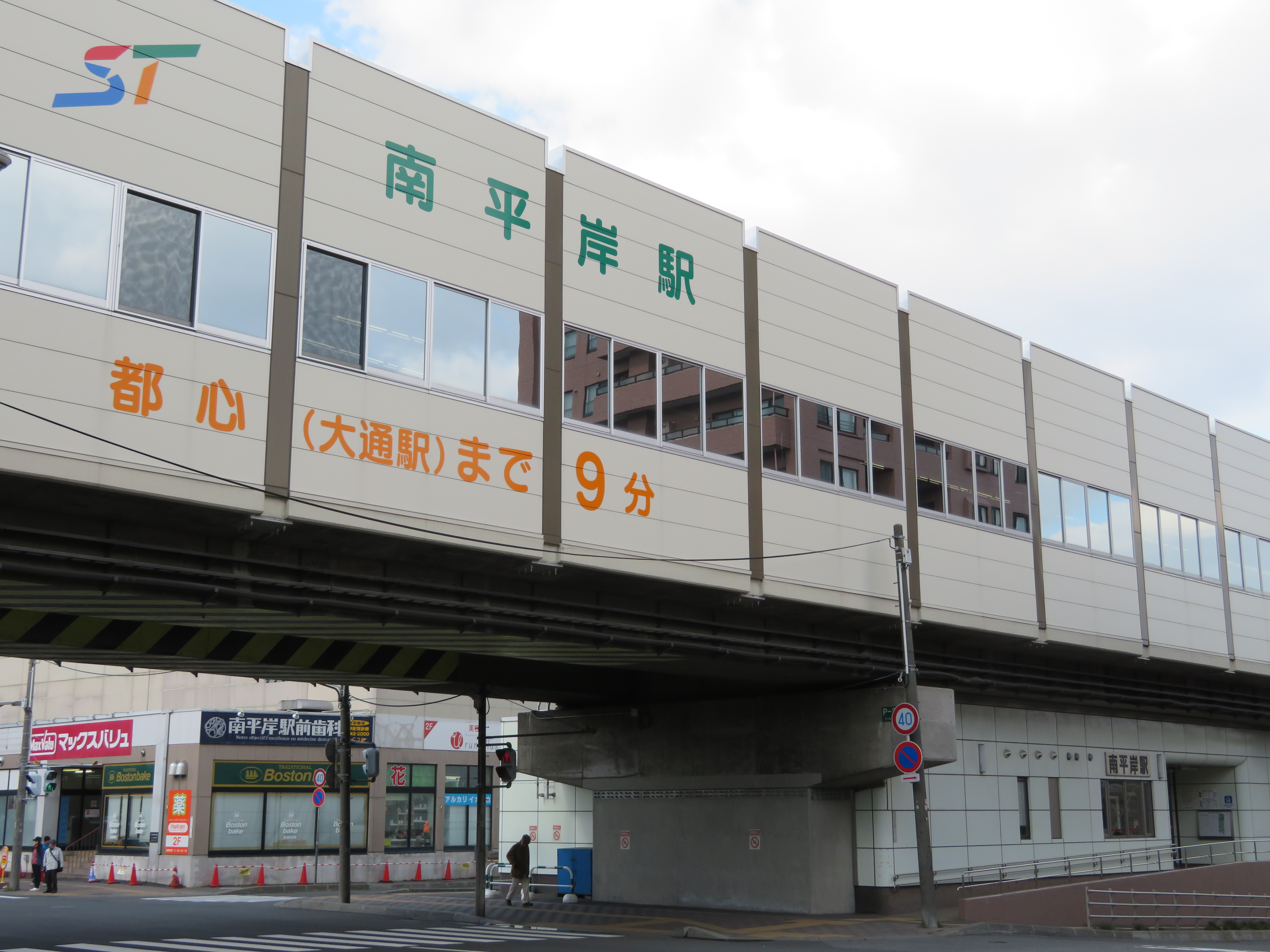
- Station view

General information
- Location: Toyohira, Sapporo, Hokkaido; Japan
- System: Sapporo Municipal Subway station
- Operator: Sapporo City Transportation Bureau
- Line: Namboku Line

Construction
- Accessible: Yes

Other information
- Station code: N13

History
- Opened: December 16, 1971; 54 years ago
- Former names: Reien-Mae (霊園前, 1971–1994)

Services
Preceding station	Sapporo Municipal Subway	Following station
Hiragishi N12 towards Asabu	Namboku Line	Sumikawa N14 towards Makomanai
Location
- Location within Hokkaido Location within Japan

Minami-Hiragishi Station (南平岸駅, Minami-Hiragishi-eki) is a Sapporo Municipal Subway station in Toyohira-ku, Sapporo, Hokkaido, Japan. The station is numbered "N13". It is one of the four Sapporo Municipal Subway stations located above-ground (all of them are at the south terminus of the Namboku Line).

== Platforms ==
1	■ Namboku Line	for Makomanai
2	■ Namboku Line	for Asabu

== History ==
The station opened on 16 December 1971 coinciding with the opening of the Namboku Line from Makomanai Station to Kita-Nijuyo-Jo Station.

== Surrounding area ==
- National Route 453, (to Date)
- Hiragishi Cemetery
- Hiragishi Hill Park
- Hokkaido Television Broadcasting (HTB)
- Sapporo Hiragishi Pool
- Toyohira Hiragishi Post Office
- Toyohira Hiragishiminami Police Station
- Sapporo City Agricultural Cooperative Association (JA Sapporo), Hiragishiminami branch
