= Sumikawa Station =

Subway station in Sapporo, Japan

Coordinates: 43°01′0.143″N 141°22′3.23″E

N14 Sumikawa Station 澄川駅
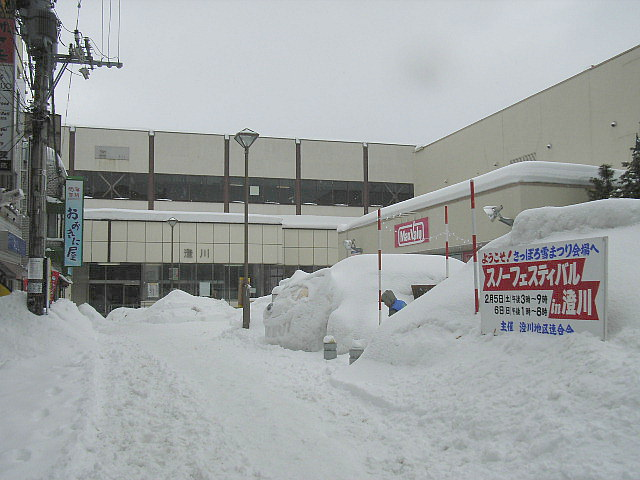
- Station front

General information
- Location: Minami, Sapporo, Hokkaido; Japan
- System: Sapporo Municipal Subway station
- Operator: Sapporo City Transportation Bureau
- Line: Namboku Line

Construction
- Accessible: Yes

Other information
- Station code: N14

History
- Opened: 1971; 55 years ago

Services
Preceding station	Sapporo Municipal Subway	Following station
Minami-Hiragishi N13 towards Asabu	Namboku Line	Jieitai-Mae N15 towards Makomanai
Location
- Location within Hokkaido Location within Japan

Sumikawa Station (澄川駅) is a rapid transit station in Minami-ku, Sapporo, Hokkaido, Japan. The station number is N14. It is one of the four Sapporo Municipal Subway stations located above-ground (all of them are at the south end of the Namboku Line).

== Platforms ==
1	■ Namboku Line	for Makomanai
2	■ Namboku Line	for Asabu

== History ==
The station opened on 16 December 1971 coinciding with the opening of the Namboku Line from Makomanai Station to Kita-Nijuyo-Jo Station.

== Surrounding area ==
- Hokkaido Chuo Bus Terminal, Sumikawa
- Sapporo Sumikawa Library
- Sapporo Sumikawa-Ekimae Post Office
- Police Station, Sumikawa South Post
- Sapporo City Agricultural Cooperative Association(JA Sapporo), Sumikawa branch
- Tenjin Mountain and Tenjinyama Art Studio
- Hokkaido International School
- Maxvalu Supermarket, Sumikawa
- Hokkaido Bank, Sumikawa branch
- North Pacific Bank, Sumikawa branch
- Sapporo Shinkin Bank Sumikawa branch
