= Kita-Jūhachi-Jō Station =

Subway station in Sapporo, Japan

Coordinates: 43°4′54.045″N 141°20′51.181″E

N04 Kita-Jūhachi-Jō Station 北18条駅
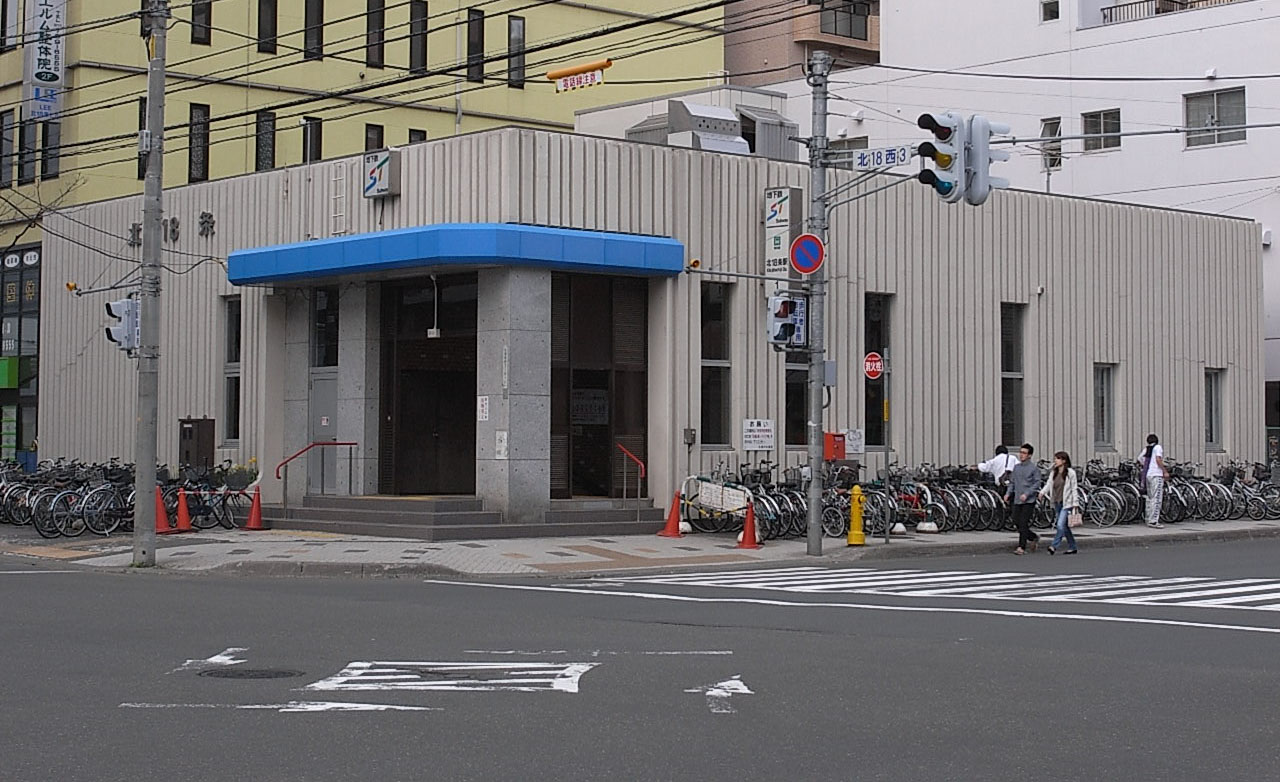
- Station front

General information
- Location: Kita, Sapporo, Hokkaido; Japan
- System: Sapporo Municipal Subway station
- Operator: Sapporo City Transportation Bureau
- Line: Namboku Line

Construction
- Accessible: Yes

Other information
- Station code: N04

History
- Opened: December 16, 1971; 54 years ago

Passengers
- FY2014 (Daily): 7,468

Services
| Preceding station | Sapporo Municipal Subway | Following station |
|---|---|---|
| Kita-Nijūyo-Jō N03 towards Asabu | Namboku Line | Kita-Jūni-Jō N05 towards Makomanai |
Location
- Location within Hokkaido Location within Japan

Kita-Jūhachi-Jō Station (Japanese: 北18条駅; lit. '"North 18th Street Station"') is a Sapporo Municipal Subway station in Kita-ku, Sapporo, Hokkaido, Japan. The station number is N04.

== Platforms ==
| 1 | ■ Namboku Line | for Makomanai |
| 2 | ■ Namboku Line | for Asabu |

== Surrounding area ==
- Japan National Route 5, (to Hakodate)
- Kita Ward Central district
- Higashi Police Station
- Hokkaido University, School of veterinary medicine
- Fuji Women's University, Kita-Jūroku-Jō

== History ==
The station opened on 16 December 1971 coinciding with the opening of the Namboku Line from Makomanai Station to Kita-Nijuyo-Jo Station.
