= Hiragishi Station (Sapporo Municipal Subway) =

Subway station in Sapporo, Japan

Coordinates: 43°2′4.579″N 141°22′5.23″E

N12 Hiragishi Station 平岸駅
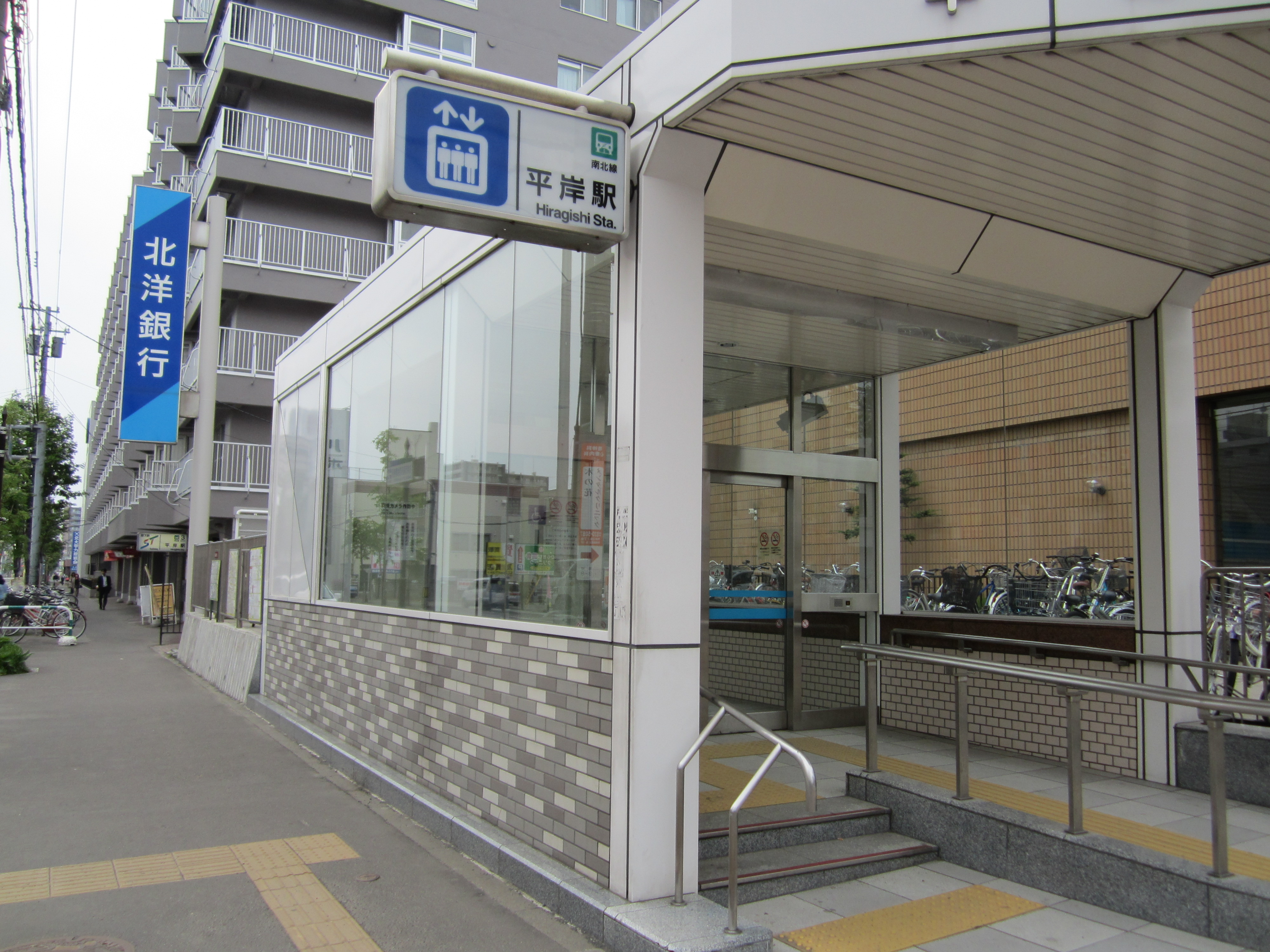
- Station exit

General information
- Location: Toyohira, Sapporo, Hokkaido; Japan
- System: Sapporo Municipal Subway station
- Operator: Sapporo City Transportation Bureau
- Line: Namboku Line

Construction
- Accessible: Yes

Other information
- Station code: N12

History
- Opened: 16 December 1971; 54 years ago

Services
Preceding station	Sapporo Municipal Subway	Following station
Nakanoshima N11 towards Asabu	Namboku Line	Minami-Hiragishi N13 towards Makomanai
Location
- Location within Hokkaido Location within Japan

Hiragishi Station (平岸駅, Hiragishi-eki) is a subway station on the Sapporo Municipal Subway in Toyohira-ku, Sapporo, Hokkaido, Japan, operated by the Sapporo Municipal Subway. The station is numbered N12.

== Platforms ==
1	■ Namboku Line	for Makomanai
2	■ Namboku Line	for Asabu

== History ==
The station opened on 16 December 1971 coinciding with the opening of the Namboku Line from Makomanai Station to Kita-Nijuyo-Jo Station.

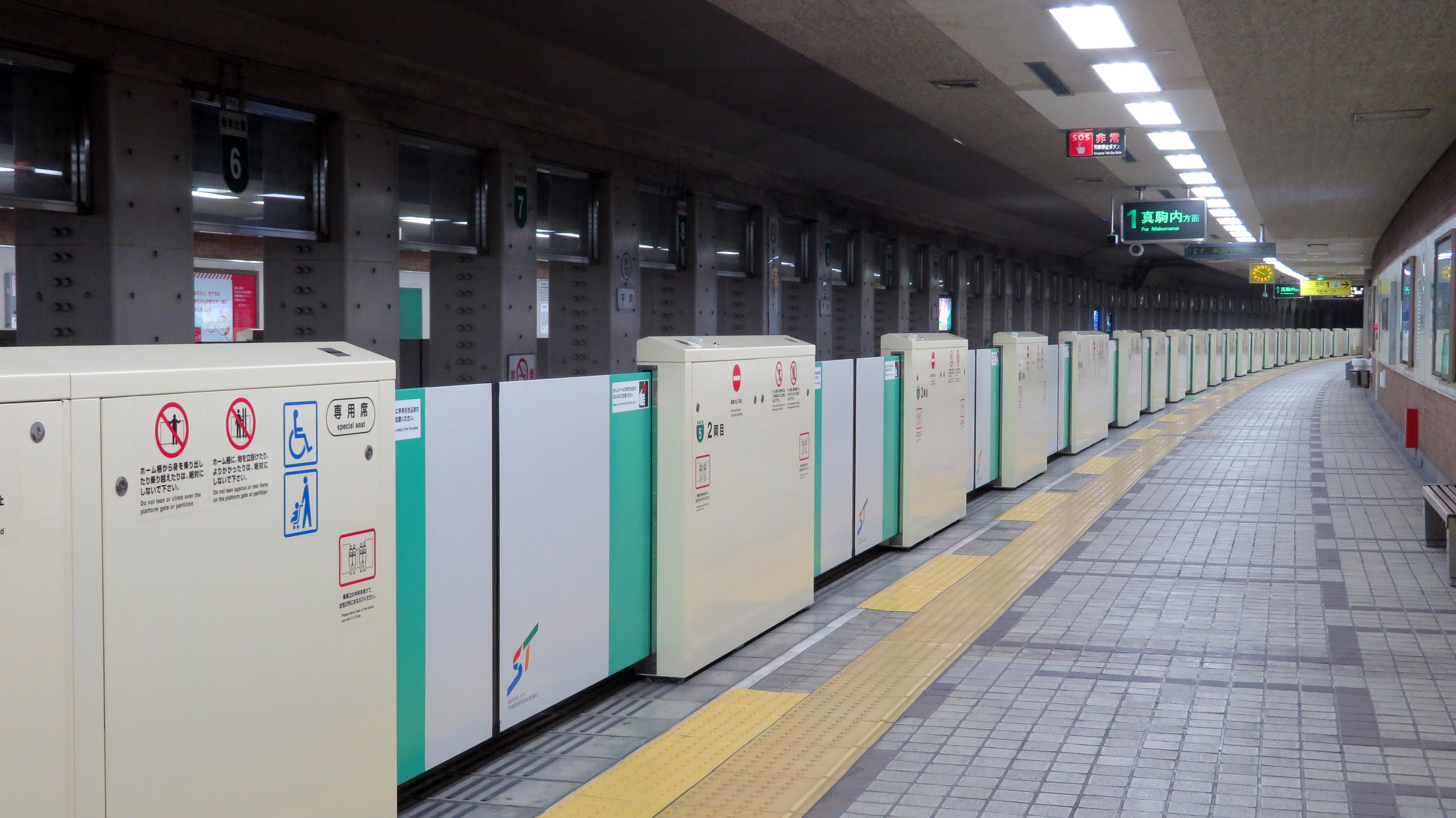
Station platforms

== Surrounding area ==
- Japan National Route 453 (to Date)
- Toyohira Ward Hiragishi Community Center
- Sapporo Hiragishi Community Center
- KKR Sapporo Medical Center, Hospital
- Hiragishi Sanjo Post Office
- Hiragishi Toyohira Police Station
- Sapporo City Agricultural Cooperative Association (JA Sapporo), Hiragishi branch
