= Jieitai-Mae Station =

Subway station in Sapporo, Japan

Coordinates: 43°00′22.417″N 141°21′53.30″E

N15 Jieitai-Mae Station 自衛隊前駅
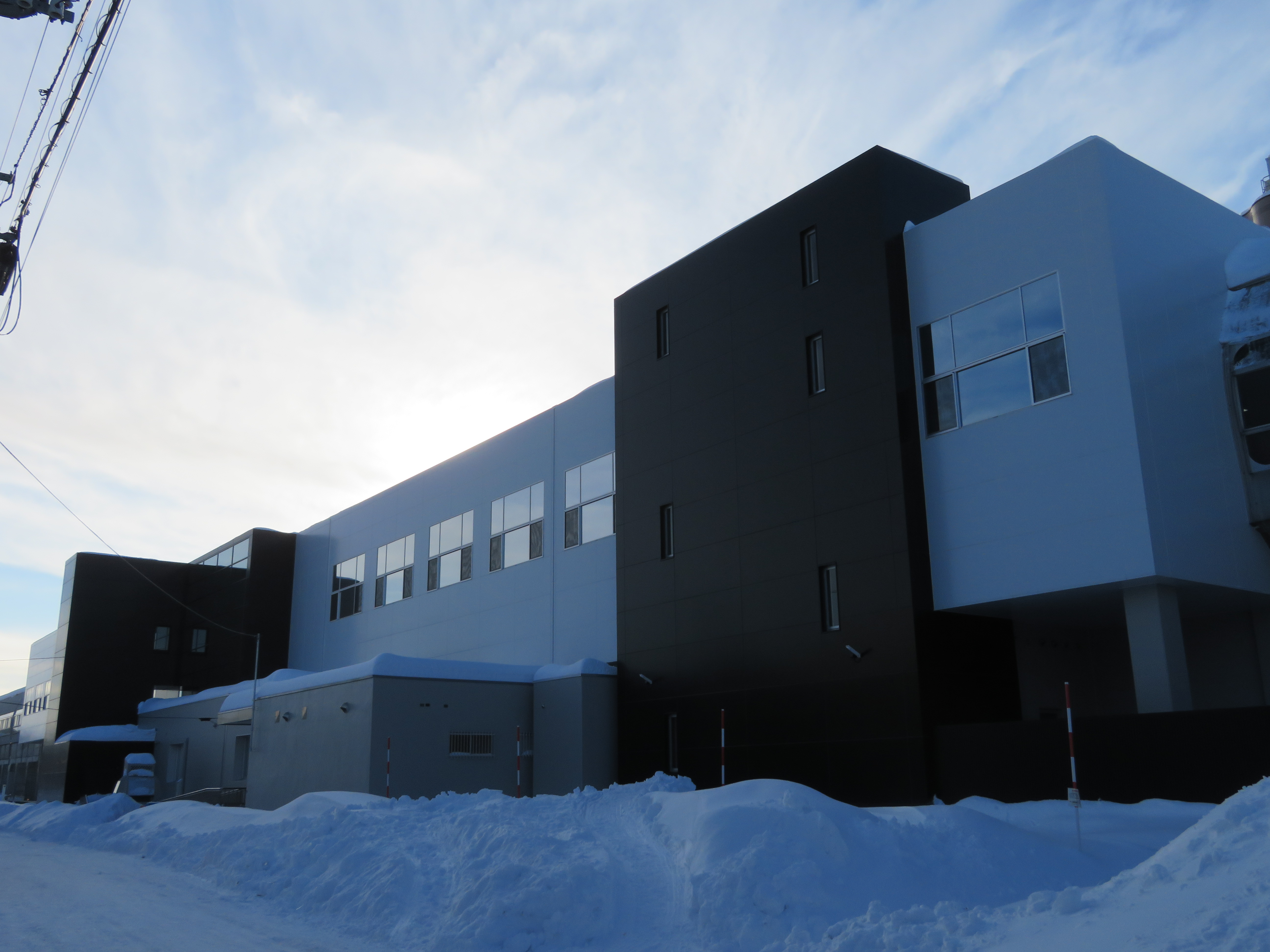
- Station exterior

General information
- Location: Minami, Sapporo, Hokkaido; Japan
- System: Sapporo Municipal Subway station
- Operator: Sapporo City Transportation Bureau
- Line: Namboku Line

Construction
- Accessible: Yes

Other information
- Station code: N15

History
- Opened: 16 December 1971; 54 years ago

Services
Preceding station	Sapporo Municipal Subway	Following station
Sumikawa N14 towards Asabu	Namboku Line	Makomanai N16 Terminus
Location
- Location within Hokkaido Location within Japan

Jieitai-Mae Station (自衛隊前駅) is a rapid transit station in Minami-ku, Sapporo, Hokkaido, Japan. The station number is N15. It is one of the four Sapporo Municipal Subway stations located above-ground (all of which are on the southernmost section of the Namboku Line).

== Platforms ==
1	■ Namboku Line	for Makomanai
2	■ Namboku Line	for Asabu

== History ==
The station opened on 16 December 1971 coinciding with the opening of the Namboku Line from Makomanai Station to Kita-Nijuyo-Jo Station.

== Surrounding area ==
- JGSDF, Camp Makomanai
- Sapporo Transportation Museum
- Sapporo Business Academy
- Tokou Store, Jieitai-mae
- Sapporo Sumikawa Post Office
- Kobiki Mountain
