= Hokkaido International School =

- 北海道インターナショナルスクール

- Hokkaido International School in Sapporo in 2014

Location
- 1-55, Hiragishi 5-jō 19-chōme, Toyohira-ku; Sapporo, Hokkaido, 062-0935; Japan; 43°00′58″N 141°22′20″E

Information
- School type: Private international school
- Established: 1958; 68 years ago
- Head of school: Hafida Becker
- Gender: Co-educational
- Campuses: Sapporo and Niseko
- Colors: Kelly Green and White
- Mascot: Husky
- Accreditation: Western Association of Schools and Colleges
- Affiliation: Japan Council of International Schools; East Asia Regional Council of Overseas Schools
- Website: https://www.his.ac.jp/

The Hokkaido International School (HIS) (北海道インターナショナルスクール, Hokkaidō Intānashonaru Sukūru) is a private U.S Department of State-Assisted American PreK-12 boarding school in Hokkaido. It was founded in 1958 as Hokkaido American School, and adopted its current name in 1962.

Its main campus, HIS Sapporo, is in Toyohira-ku, Sapporo. The campus has approximately 240 to 280 students. The school runs the International Primary Curriculum in the elementary school (Early Years to grade 5) the follow on International Middle Years Program in grades 6~8 and the American AP (Advanced Placement) program in the high school. The institution is accredited by the Western Association of Schools and Colleges.

The school has a branch elementary school campus in Niseko, Hokkaido, Hokkaido International School in Niseko (HIS Niseko), that opened on January 23, 2012. The two campuses are the sole English-language international schools in Hokkaido, besides small ones.

== Campus ==
Hokkaido International School's main campus is located in the neighborhood of Sumikawa Station on the Namboku Line of the city's subway system. The campus consists of a co-educational dormitory composed of both genders, a soccer field, basketball court, indoor gym, and a 4-story main block.

== Dormitory ==
Hokkaido International School's dormitory is located on campus. It is a co-educational dormitory, housing students from grades 9-12.

== See also ==
- Americans in Japan
