= Observation Hill =

Observation Hill may refer to:

- Observation Hill (Somaliland), location of Battle of Tug Argan in Somaliland
- Observation Hill (McMurdo Station), Antarctica
- Observation Hill, a neighbourhood of Central Hillside, Duluth, Minnesota, U.S.
- Observation Hill, Makongo, Dar es Salaam Region, Tanzania, site of Ardhi University
- Observation Hill, in the Mubo area of the Territory of New Guinea, location of the 1943 Battle of Mubo
- Rasattepe (Observation Hill), site of Anıtkabir mausoleum in Ankara, Turkey

== See also ==
- Hitsujigaoka Observation Hill, a scenic spot in Toyohira-ku, Sapporo, Hokkaidō, Japan
