= Sumikawa =

Sumikawa (written: 澄川) is a Japanese surname. Notable people with the surname include:

- Makoto Sumikawa (澄川 真琴, born 1964), Japanese actress and voice actress

== See also ==
- Sumikawa Station, a railway station in Minami-ku, Sapporo, Hokkaido Prefecture, Japan
