= HTU =

HTU may refer to:

== Universities ==
- Hokkaido Tokai University in Japan
- Holy Trinity University, in Puerto Princesa City, Palawan, Philippines
- Huston–Tillotson University, in Austin, Texas, United States

== Other uses ==
- Hashtag United, a YouTube-based association football club
- Hitu language, spoken in Indonesia
- Hongtu Airlines, a Chinese airline
- Hopetoun Airport, in Victoria, Australia
- Hydrothermal upgrading
