= Minami-ku, Sapporo =

Coordinates: 42°59′24″N 141°21′12″E

Minami 南区
- Ward
- Minami Ward
- Flag Seal

- Location of Minami-ku in Sapporo
- Country: Japan
- Prefecture: Hokkaidō
- City: Sapporo
- Established: April 1, 1972

Area
  - Total: 657.48 km^{2} (253.85 sq mi)

Population (2021)
  - Total: 135,386
  - Density: 205.92/km^{2} (533.32/sq mi)
- Estimation as of August 31, 2021
- Time zone: UTC+9 (Japan Standard Time)
- Postal: 005-8612
- Address: 2-2-1 Makomanaisaiwaicho, Higashi-ku, Sapporo-shi, Hokkaido
- Website: Minami-ku Ward Office

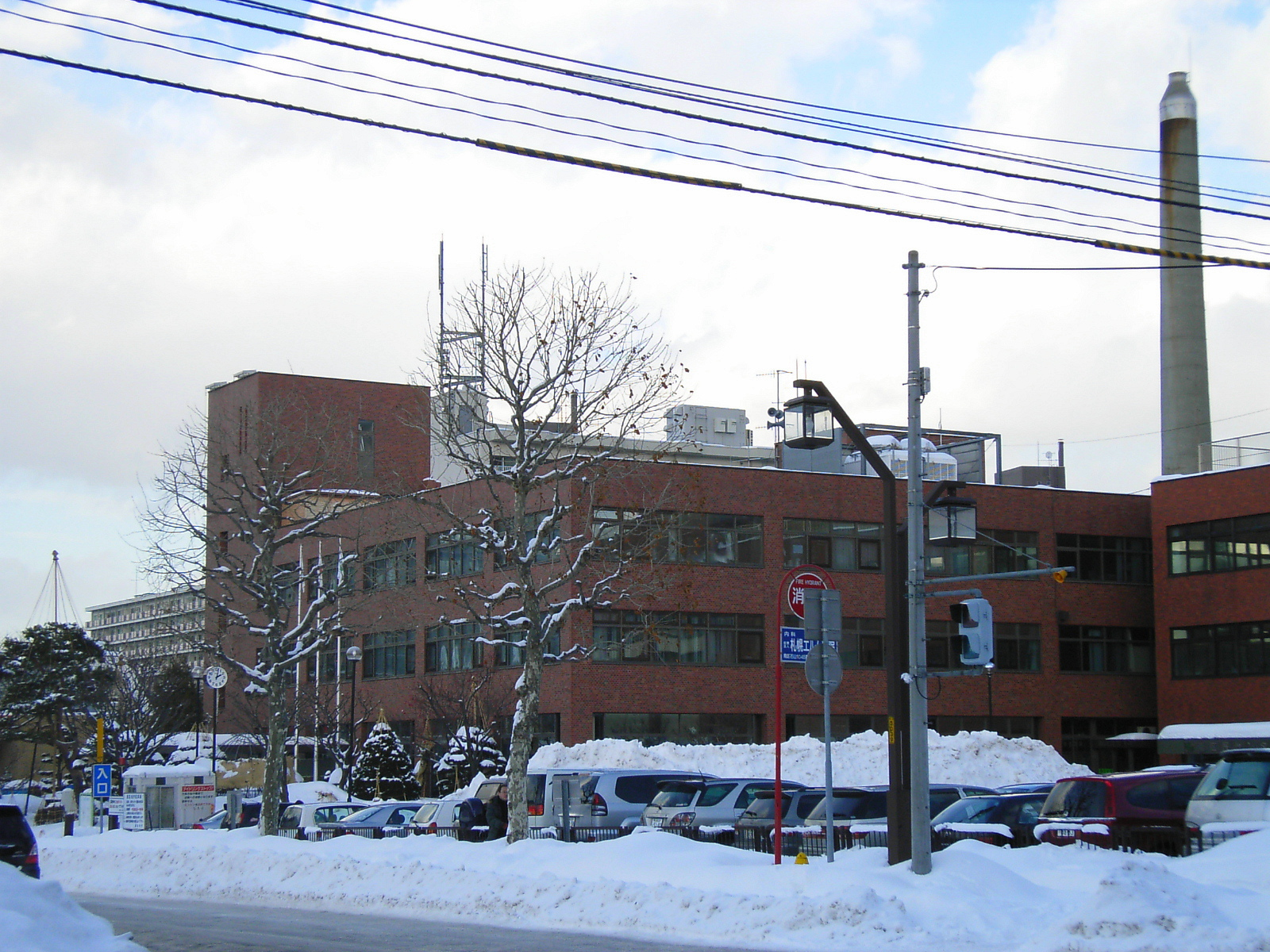
Minami-ku, ward office

Minami-ku (南区) is one of the 10 wards in Sapporo, Hokkaidō, Japan. Minami-ku is directly translated as "south ward". Having the area of 657.48 km^{2} in total, Minami-ku occupies 60 percent of the area of Sapporo.

== Overview ==
According to the jūminhyō (registry) in 2008, 149,139 people were living in Minami-ku. The total area of the ward is 657.48 km^{2}, which is the largest in Sapporo. 17 mountains including Mount Yoichi (1488.1 metres, the highest mountain in Sapporo) are included in the ward, along with part of the Shikotsu-Tōya National Park.

Sapporo's five wards: Chūō-ku, Toyohira-ku, Kiyota-ku, Nishi-ku, Teine-ku, have boundaries with Minami-ku, and four cities (Chitose, Otaru, Date, Eniwa), two towns (Kimobetsu, Kyōgoku), and a village (Akaigawa) also have boundaries.

== History ==
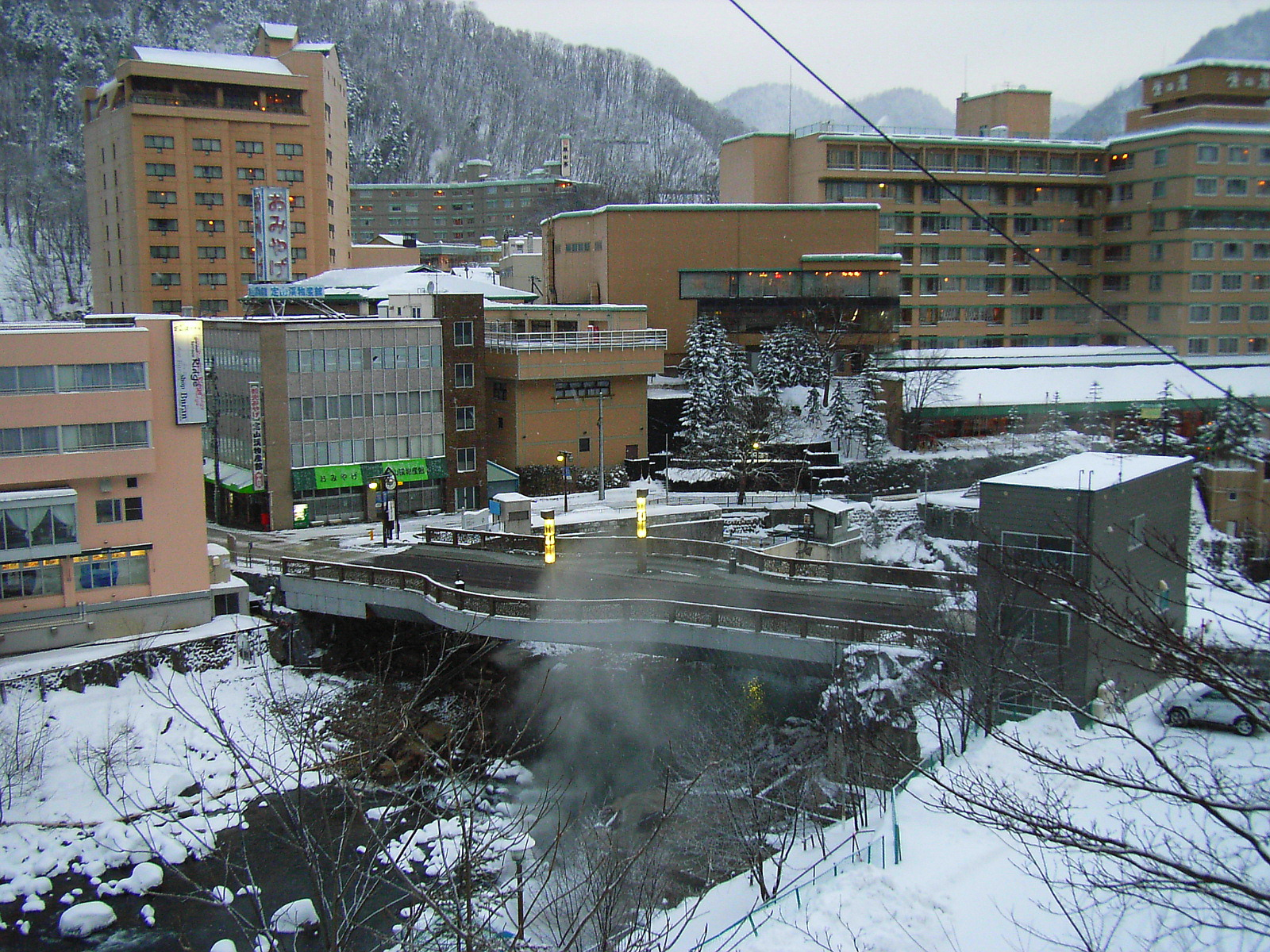
Jōzankei Onsen (Jōzankei hot spring resort)

Originally, the area where currently Minami-ku is located has been famous for the hot springs in Jōzankei area and mines in Ishiyama area, and many pioneers and their families have settled from the outside of Hokkaidō. In 1918, the Jōzankei Railroad was opened for traffic from Shiroishi area to current Minami-ku area. In 1946, after the end of World War II, American army took over farms in Makomanai area and built a military facility called Camp Crawford.

The restoration of the Camp Crawford began in 1955, and camps of the Japan Ground Self-Defense Force were started to build. In 1972, Sapporo Winter Olympics was held in Sapporo, and a number of sports competitions were held in Makomanai area, including biathlon, cross-country skiing, figure skating, ice hockey, and the cross-country skiing portion of the Nordic combined events. In the same year, Sapporo was listed as one of the cities designated by government ordinance, and Minami-ku was established. The camp of the Self-Defense Force has been one of the venues of the Sapporo Snow Festival, however, it was abolished and moved to the Sapporo Satoland site located in Higashi-ku, in 2005.

== Transportation ==
- Sapporo Municipal Subway
  - Namboku Line: Sumikawa - Jieitai-Mae - Makomanai

== Education ==
=== Universities ===
==== Public ====
- Sapporo City University

==== Private ====
- Hokkaido Tokai University

=== Colleges ===
- Koen Gakuen Women's Junior College
- Hokkaido Bunkyo University Junior College

=== High schools ===
==== Public ====
- Hokkaido Sapporo Nanryou High School
- Hokkaido Sapporo Keihoku Commercial High School
- Hokkaido Sapporo Moiwa High School

==== Private ====
- Hokusei Gakuen Girls' Junior & Senior High School - 北星学園女子中学高等学校
- Sapporo Shinyo High School
- Hokkaido Bunkyo University Meisei High School
- Tokai University Daiyon High School

== Points of interest ==
- Jozankei hot springs resort - a number of hotels and resorts with hot springs.
- Makomanai Park - a park including the Makomanai Ice Arena, Makomanai Open Stadium, and Sapporo Salmon Museum.
- Sapporo Art Park - a park with many public arts.
- Monami Park - a park including a mine of the Sapporo Nanseki (soft stone).
- Mount Moiwa - observation deck and ski resort.
  - Mount Moiwa Ropeway
