= Sapporo Municipal Subway 5000 series =

Japanese train type

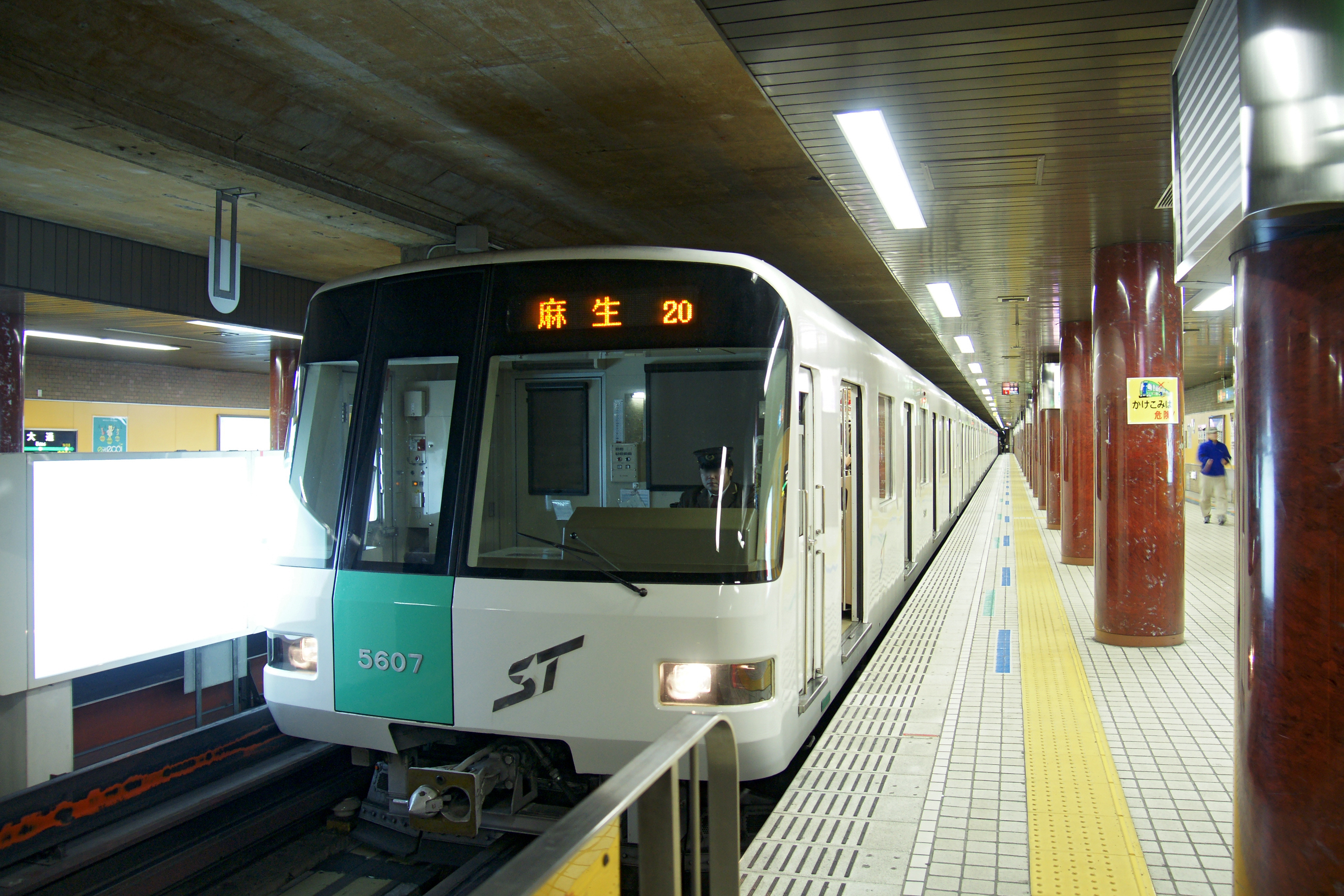
- 5107 at Ōdōri in October 2009

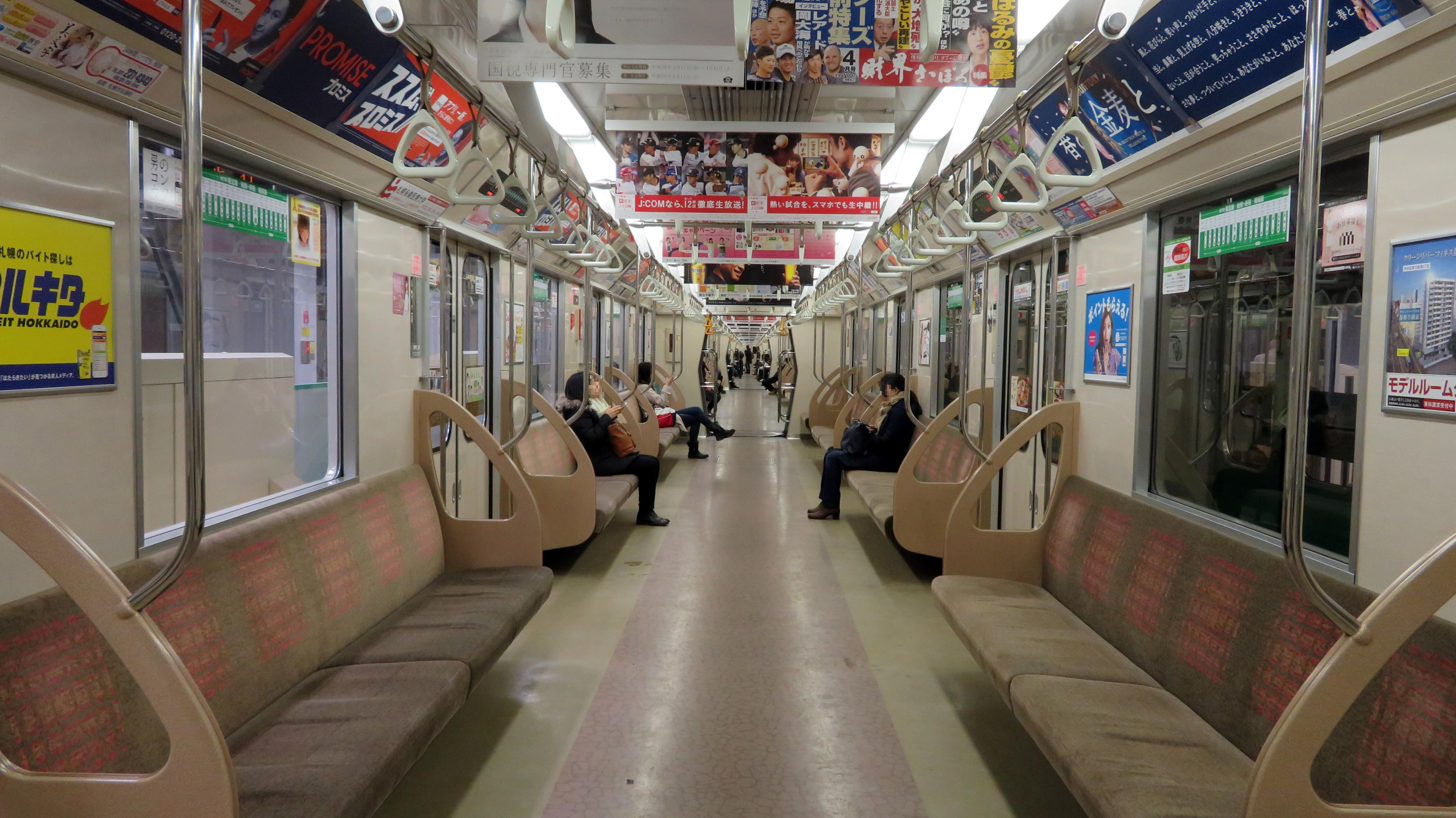
- Interior (March 2017)
- In service: 1995–present
- Manufacturer: Kawasaki Heavy Industries
- Replaced: 2000 & 3000 series
- Constructed: 1995–1998 (5101-517); 2009–2011 (5118-520)
- Entered service: 1 November 1995
- Number built: 120 vehicles (20 sets)
- Number in service: 120 vehicles (20 sets)
- Formation: 6 cars per trainset
- Fleet numbers: 5101-5120
- Capacity: 828
- Operators: Sapporo Municipal Subway
- Lines served: Namboku Line

Specifications
- Car body construction: Aluminum
- Car length: 18.4 m (60 ft 4 in)
- Width: 3.08 m (10 ft 1 in)
- Height: 3.73 m (12 ft 3 in)
- Floor height: 1.33 m (4 ft 4 in)
- Doors: 4 pairs per side
- Maximum speed: 70 km/h (43 mph)
- Weight: 179.4 tonnes (176.6 long tons; 197.8 short tons)
- Traction system: IGBT–VVVF
- Traction motors: 4 × 150 kW (201 hp) 3-phase AC induction motor
- Power output: 1.8 MW (2,414 hp)
- Acceleration: 1.1 m/s^{2} (2.5 mph/s)
- Deceleration: 1.1 m/s^{2} (2.5 mph/s) (service); 1.4 m/s^{2} (3.1 mph/s) (emergency)
- Electric system(s): 750 V DC third rail
- Current collection: Contact shoe
- UIC classification: 2'2'+Bo'Bo'+Bo'Bo'+2'2'+Bo'Bo'+2'2'
- Bogies: KW-111 (powered cars); KW-112 (control and trailer cars)
- Braking system(s): Regenerative and electro-pneumatic
- Safety system(s): ATC under semi-ATO GoA 2
- Track gauge: Central and side-mounted guideways, with rubber tires

The Sapporo Municipal Subway 5000 series (札幌市交通局5000形) is a DC electric multiple unit (EMU) rubber-tyred metro train type operated by Sapporo Municipal Subway on the Namboku Line in the city of Sapporo, Japan, since October 1995.

== Design ==
The trains are built by Kawasaki Heavy Industries and have aluminum bodies. Each car has four doors per side as opposed to two per side as seen on the older 2000 series and 3000 series cars. The 5000 series cars remain the only cars on the entire subway system with four doors.

The 5000 series use VVVF inverter control using insulated-gate bipolar transistor technology as opposed to the chopper control on the 3000 series and resistor control on the 2000 series, which helps to reduce power consumption and maintenance costs.

== Formations ==
The 5000 series trains are formed as six-car sets as shown below.

Car No.	1	2	3	4	5	6
Designation	Tc1	M1	M2	T	M3	Tc2
Numbering	5100	5200	5300	5400	5500	5600
Weight (t)	24.3	25.3		23.4	25.3	24.3
Capacity (total/seated)	128/42	143/45				128/42

== Interior ==
Passenger accommodation consists of longitudinal bench seating throughout, with a wheelchair space in each car. The first 17 sets use LCD destination indicators; the 18th to 20th sets use LCD displays as destination indicators.

== History ==
Built in 1995 to combat issues of platform congestion, the first 5000 series set was introduced onto the line in October 1995; a total of 17 sets were introduced from 1995 to 1999, ultimately replacing all of the 2000 series sets in service. Three more sets were introduced from 2009 to 2011 to replace the last remaining 3000 series sets at the time.
