= Namboku Line (Sapporo) =

Rubber-tyred rail line in Sapporo, Japan

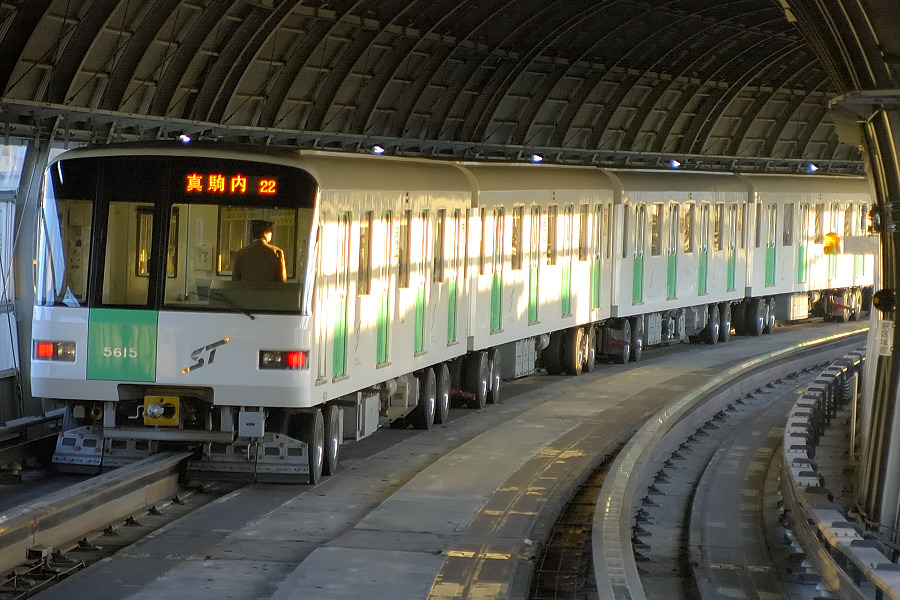
- 5000 series EMU near Minami-Hiragishi Station

Overview
- Owner: Sapporo City Transportation Bureau
- Locale: Sapporo, Hokkaidō
- Termini: Asabu; Makomanai
- Stations: 16
- Color on map: Green

Service
- Type: Rubber-tyred metro
- System: Sapporo Municipal Subway
- Rolling stock: 5000 series EMUs
- Daily ridership: 219,400 (2023 estimate)

History
- Opened: 16 December 1971; 54 years ago
- Last extension: 16 March 1978; 48 years ago

Technical
- Line length: 14.3 km (8.89 mi)
- Number of tracks: Double-tracked
- Track gauge: Central and side-mounted guideways, with rubber tires
- Electrification: 750 V DC third rail
- Operating speed: 70 km/h (43 mph) (Maximum)
- Signalling: Cab signalling
- Maximum incline: 4.3%

The Namboku Line (南北線, Nanboku-sen; lit. 'South-North Line') is a rubber-tyred metro line of the Sapporo Municipal Subway, serving Sapporo, Hokkaido, Japan. It runs from Asabu Station in Kita-ku to Makomanai Station in Minami-ku, with 16 stations. Its map color is green, and its stations station designations use the Latin letter N (initial of Namboku) followed by two digits.

== Station list ==
- All stations are located in Sapporo.

No.	Station name	Japanese	Distance (km)		Transfers	Above/below ground	Location
No.	Station name	Japanese	Between stations	Total	Transfers	Above/below ground	Location
N01	Asabu	麻生	-	0.0	Sasshō Line ( G05 Shin-Kotoni)	Underground	Kita-ku
N02	Kita-Sanjūyo-Jō	北34条	1.0	1.0		Underground	Kita-ku
N03	Kita-Nijūyo-Jō	北24条	1.2	2.2		Underground	Kita-ku
N04	Kita-Jūhachi-Jō	北18条	0.9	3.1		Underground	Kita-ku
N05	Kita-Jūni-Jō	北12条	0.8	3.9		Underground	Kita-ku
N06	Sapporo	さっぽろ	1.0	4.9	Tōhō Line ( H07 ) Hakodate Main Line( 01 )	Underground	Chūō-ku
N07	Ōdōri	大通	0.6	5.5	Tōzai Line ( T09 ) Tōhō Line ( H08 ) Sapporo Streetcar (Nishi-Yon-Chōme)	Underground	Chūō-ku
N08	Susukino	すすきの	0.6	6.1	Sapporo Streetcar	Underground	Chūō-ku
N09	Nakajima-Kōen	中島公園	0.7	6.8	Sapporo Streetcar (Yamahana-Ku-Jō)	Underground	Chūō-ku
N10	Horohira-Bashi	幌平橋	1.0	7.8	Sapporo Streetcar (Seishūgakuen-Mae)	Underground	Chūō-ku
N11	Nakanoshima	中の島	0.5	8.3		Underground	Toyohira-ku
N12	Hiragishi	平岸	0.7	9.0		Underground	Toyohira-ku
N13	Minami-Hiragishi	南平岸	1.1	10.1		Above ground	Toyohira-ku
N14	Sumikawa	澄川	1.2	11.3		Above ground	Minami-ku
N15	Jieitai-Mae	自衛隊前	1.3	12.6		Above ground	Minami-ku
N16	Makomanai	真駒内	1.7	14.3		Above ground	Minami-ku

== History ==
- 16 December 1971: Kita-Nijūyo-Jō – Makomanai section opens; 1000 series trains introduced.
- 16 March 1978: Kita-Nijūyo-Jō – Asabu section opens; all trains operated as 8-car sets.
- 1 October 1978: 3000 series trains introduced.
- 14 October 1994: Reien-Mae Station renamed Minami-Hiragishi Station.
- September 1995: 5000 series trains introduced.
- 27 June 1999: 1000/2000 series trains withdrawn.
- 18 August 2008: Women-only cars introduced on trial basis (until September 12, 2008).
- 15 December 2008: "Women and Children Comfort Car" introduced.
- 30 January 2009: SAPICA contactless smart card introduced.
- 2023: Line reports 219,400 daily riders, roughly 95% of 2019 totals

== Future developments ==
Platform edge doors are scheduled to be installed on all stations by 2014.
