= Toyohira-ku =

Toyohira 豊平区
- Ward
- Toyohira Ward
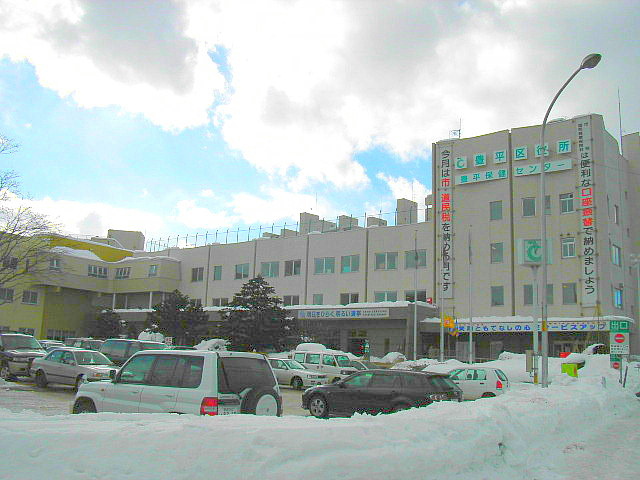
- Toyohira ward office

- Flag Seal

- Location of Toyohira-ku in Sapporo

- Location within Japan
- Coordinates: 43°00′48″N 141°23′28″E
- Country: Japan
- Region: Hokkaido
- Prefecture: Ishikari
- Established: April 1, 1972

Area
  - Total: 46.23 km^{2} (17.85 sq mi)

Population (August 31, 2021)
  - Total: 224,958
  - Density: 4,866/km^{2} (12,600/sq mi)
- Time zone: UTC+9 (Japan Standard Time)
- Postal: 086-8612
- Address: 10-1-1 Hiragishi Rokujyo, Toyohira-ku, Sapporo-shi, Hokkaido
- Telephone: 011-822-2400
- Symbol of Flower: Tsukubane Asagao
- Website: www.city.sapporo.jp/toyohira

Toyohira-ku (豊平区) is one of the 10 wards in Sapporo, Hokkaido, Japan. The ward was established in 1972, when the Sapporo Olympics was held in Sapporo. Four other wards in Sapporo are bounded on Toyohira-ku.

As of April 1, 2012, the ward has an estimated population of 214,437, with 109,510 households and a population density of 4,626.47 persons per km^{2}. The total area is 46.35 km^{2}.

== Overview ==
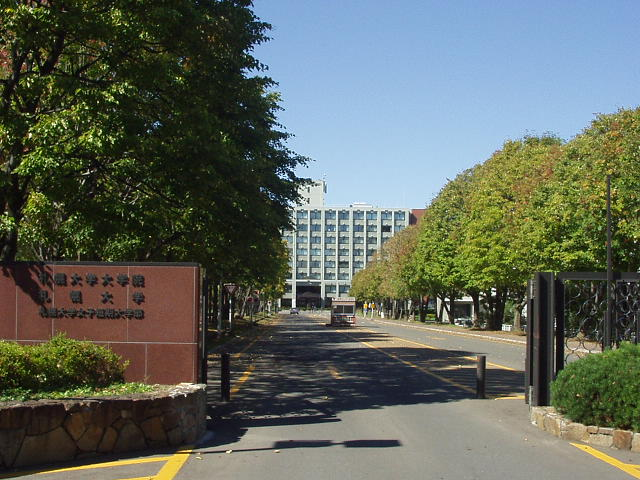
Sapporo University

The name "Toyohira" is derived from the Ainu language and means "crumbled cliff". The symbol flower of the ward is the Petunia. The ward has two mascot characters: Korin is a character based on an apple, as apples used to be grown in Toyohira-ku, and Mētan is based on a sheep, which are bred on Hitsujigaoka Observation Hill. Toyohira-ku has some sports venues which were constructed for the Sapporo Olympics in 1972, and the Sapporo Dome is also located there.

According to the jūminhyō (registry of current residential addresses and figures) in 2008, 209,358 people are living in Toyohira-ku, namely 97,999 males and 111,336 females. The total area of the ward is 46.35 km^{2}, and it is adjacent to four other wards in Sapporo: Minami-ku, Chūō-ku, Kiyota-ku, and Shiroishi-ku.

Toyohira-ku has a number of rivers including the Toyohira River, a tributary of the Ishikari River. The Sapporo University, Hokkai Gakuen University, and Hokkai School of Commerce are located in Toyohira-ku, as well as a number of high schools, junior high schools, elementary schools and nursery schools.

== History ==
In 1857, the railroad from Zenibako area in Otaru was laid in the place where Toyohira-ku is currently located. After the Meiji Period, the cultivation in Toyohira-ku was started by pioneers from Honshū, and Hiragishi Village and Tsukisamu Village were formed in 1872, Toyohira Village was established in 1874.

The apple farms were established in Hiragishi Village, which later became famous as the Hiragishi Apple, the IJA 7th Division was posted in Tsukisamu Village, and many stores and hotels were erected along the Route 36. Hiragishi and Tsukisamu villages were merged into Toyohira Village in 1902.

In 1908, Toyohira Town was established, and in 1910, Toyohira district in the town was merged into Sapporo district, which was the predecessor of Sapporo City. The entire area of Toyohira Town was merged into Sapporo City in 1961.

In 1972, the Sapporo Olympics were held in Sapporo, and as Sapporo was listed as one of the cities designated by government ordinance in the same year, the eastern area of Toyohira Town was split and Toyohira-ku was officially established. In 1997, part of Toyohira-ku was split, and Kiyota-ku was established.

== Education ==
=== Universities ===
- Hokkai Gakuen University
- Sapporo University
- Hokkai School of Commerce

=== Colleges ===
- Japan Health Care College
- Sapporo University Women's College

=== High schools ===
==== Public ====
- Hokkaido Sapporo Tsukisamu High School (Prefectural)
- Hokkaido Sapporo Hiragishi High School (Municipal)

==== Private ====
- Hokkai High School
- Hokkai Gakuen Sapporo High School
- Hokkaido Shoshi Gakuen High School
- Sapporo Daiichi High School
- Ikegami Gakuen High School

=== International school ===
- Hokkaido International School

== Transportation ==
- Sapporo Municipal Subway
  - Namboku Line: Nakanoshima - Hiragishi - Minami-Hiragishi
  - Tōhō Line: Gakuen-Mae - Toyohira-Kōen - Misono - Tsukisamu-Chūō - Fukuzumi
- Route 36

== Points of interest ==
- Sapporo Dome - a stadium which is the home field of the Hokkaido Nippon-Ham Fighters baseball team, and Consadole Sapporo football club
- Hitsujigaoka Observation Hill - where visitors can view the scene of Sapporo City from the hill, also famous for the bronze statue of William S. Clark
- Tsukisamu Dome - one of the events and sports venues in Sapporo
- Hokkaido Prefectural Sports Center (Kitayell) - an indoor sporting arena
- Tsukisamu Gymnasium - an indoor ice arena
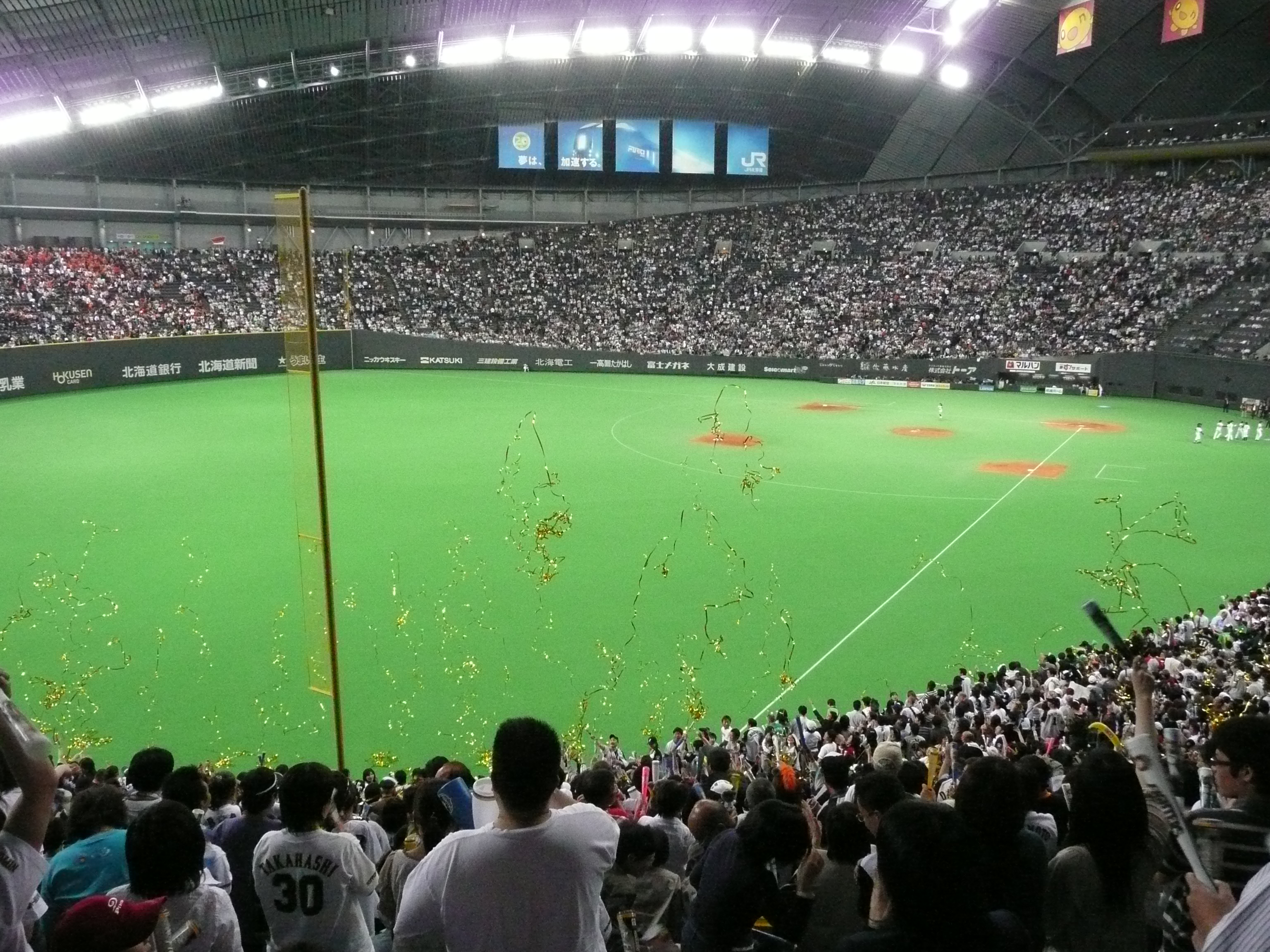
Sapporo Dome

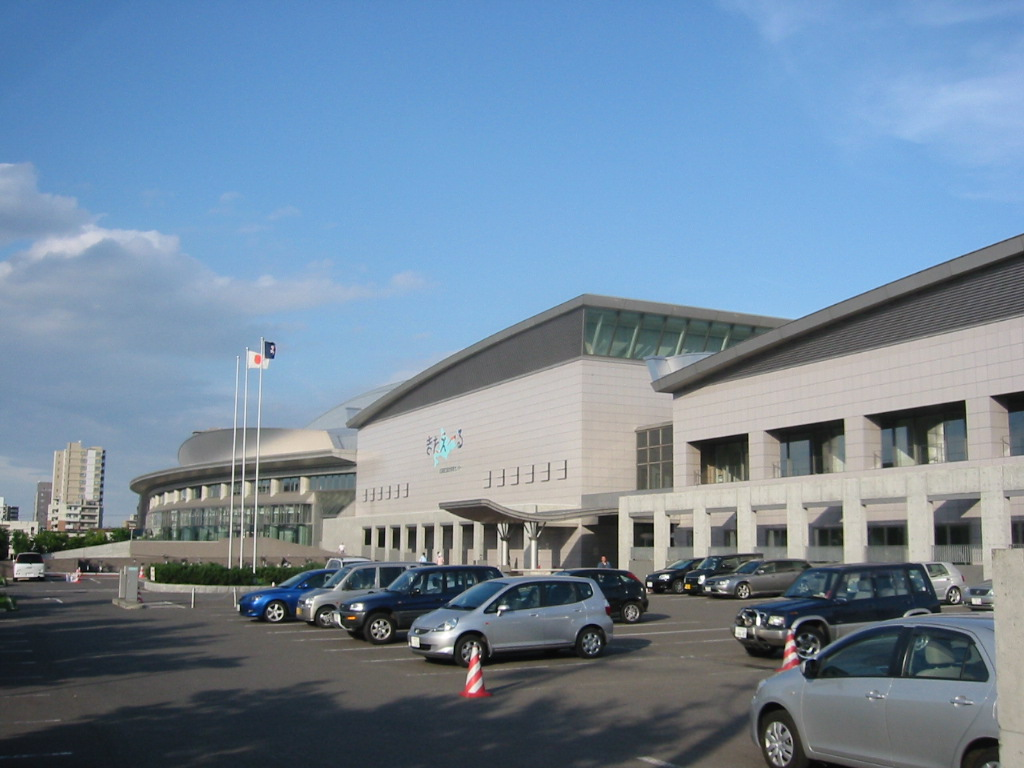
Kitayell Arena

== Mascots ==
Korin and Me-tan, the ward's mascots

Toyohira's mascots are Korin (こりん) and Me-tan (めーたん). Both worked for the Prefectural Police as detectives.

- Korin is a bright and solid apple who loves to read. She is a good cleaner as she cared about quality. She lives in an apple tree farm. Her dress contains a petunia brooch.
- Me-tan is an easygoing sheep who eats healthy and play sports. He lives in the Hitsujigaoka Observation Deck. He leaves footprints that can shine light.
