= Hokkaido Tokai University =

Former educational institution in Japan

- 北海道東海大学
- Other names: HTU
- Type: Private
- Active: 1977–2008
- Parent institution: Tokai University Educational System
- Academic staff: 101 (full‑time, 2005)
- Students: 2,079 (2005)
- Location: Sapporo; Asahikawa, Hokkaido, Japan; 35°39′52.121″N 139°41′5.280″E

Hokkaido Tokai University (北海道東海大学, Hokkaidō Tōkai Daigaku; HTU) was a university with two campuses in Hokkaido, Japan: the Sapporo campus in Minami-ku, which housed the School of Engineering and the School of International Cultural Relations; and the Asahikawa campus, which housed the School of Art and Technology. The University officially established in 1977 by the Tokai University Educational System. In 2008 the university merged into Tokai University and both campuses became Tokai University Hokkaido Campuses (Sapporo campus and Asahikawa campus). Tokai University closed the School of Art and Technology (Asahikawa campus) in 2015.

== Demographics ==
In 2005 the school had 101 full-time faculty members and 2,079 students.
