= Mount Moiwa =

Mountain in Sapporo, Japan

- 藻岩山
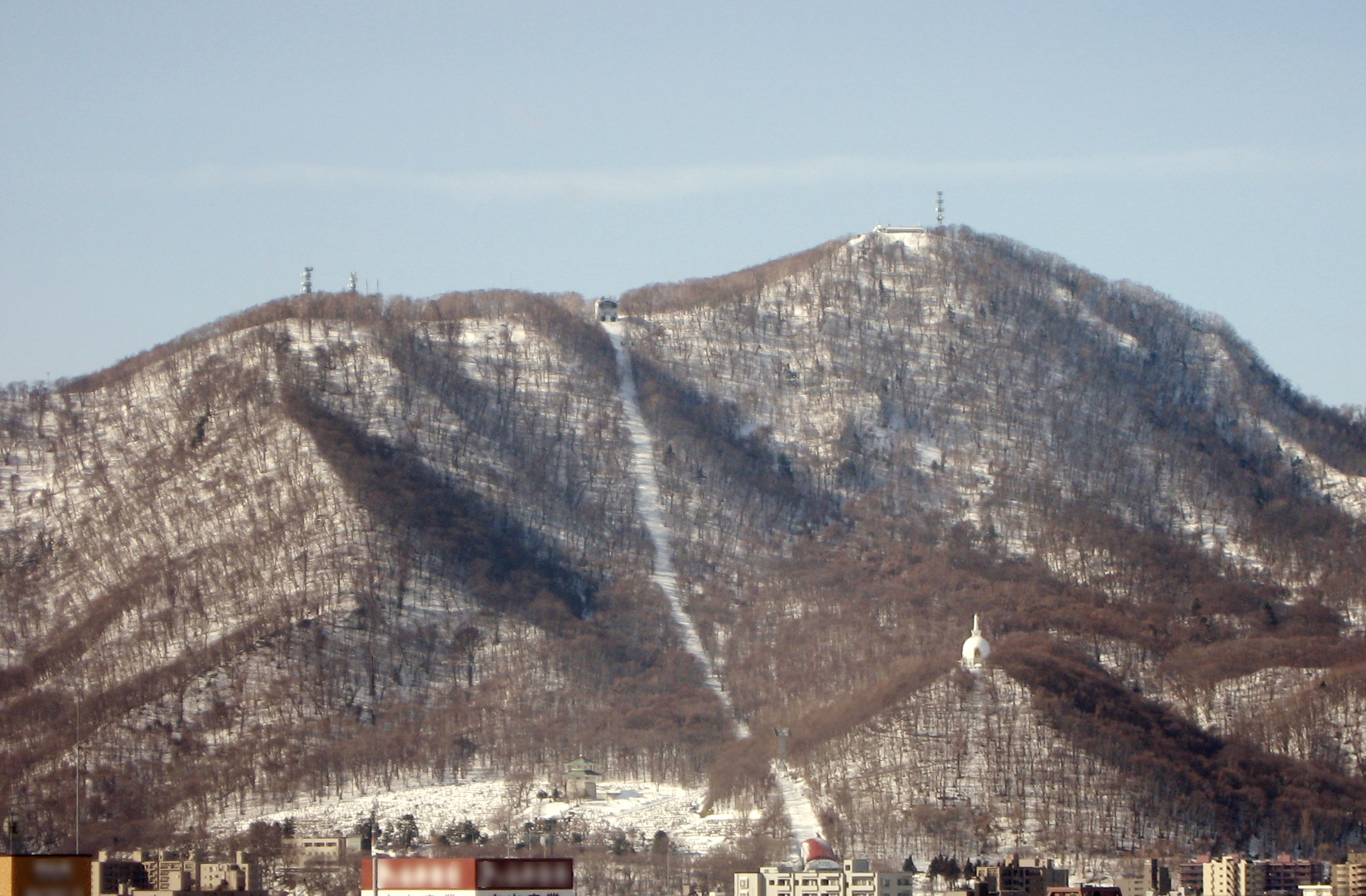
- Mount Moiwa in 2009.

Highest point
- Elevation: 531 m (1,742 ft)
- Coordinates: 43°01′21″N 141°19′20″E

Geography
- Location within Japan Location within Hokkaido Location within Sapporo
- Location: Sapporo, Hokkaido, Japan

Mount Moiwa (藻岩山, Moiwayama) is a mountain located about 5 km (3 mi) southwest of the center of Sapporo, Hokkaido and 6 km (4 mi) southwest of Sapporo Station. A ropeway and a motorway pass through Mt. Moiwa, and an observatory and a ski resort in winter make it a resort for Sapporo citizens and tourists.
