= Hitsujigaoka Observation Hill =

Coordinates: 42°59′57″N 141°23′41″E

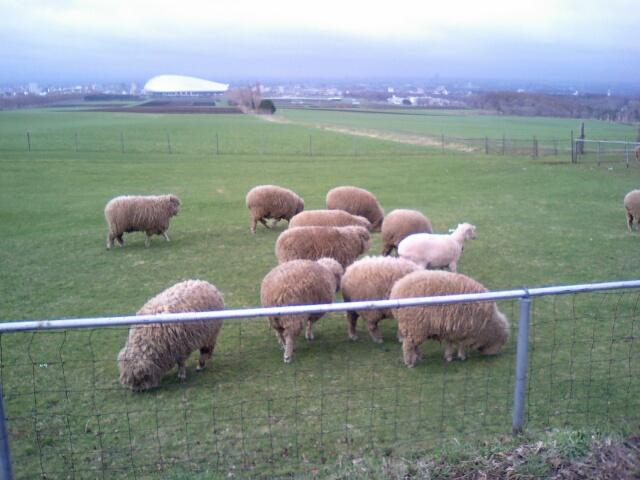
Sheep in Hitsujigaoka Observation Hill

Hitsujigaoka Observation Hill (羊ヶ丘展望台, Hitsujigaoka Tembōdai) is a famous scenic spot located in Toyohira-ku, Sapporo, Hokkaidō, Japan. The bronze statue of Dr. William S. Clark, which stands on the hill, is well known as the symbol of frontier spirit of Hokkaidō.

== History ==
Since 1906, the hill was developed as a former national cattle breeding station, and in 1919, sheep breeding was started. From which the place name "Hitsujigaoka" derives. The literal meaning is "hill of sheep".

In 1959, Hitsujigaoka Observation Hill was opened on the upper side of the hill, within the Hokkaido National Agricultural Research Center.

In 1976, the statue of Dr. Clark was erected as a centennial monument to his visit to Hokkaidō. His famous words "Boys, be ambitious!" are inscribed on the pedestal.

== Charm of the hill ==
The Hill, located in the southeast part of Sapporo provides a panoramic view of the Ishikari plain, with the Sapporo Dome in the foreground.

Sheep graze freely in the area during the summer, which creates a pastoral scenery.

The statue of Dr. Clark is famous as the symbol of Hokkaidō's pioneer spirit. Many tourists take pictures of themselves with the statue as the background.

== Facilities ==
- Austrian House - souvenir shop
- Rest House - the restaurant where you can eat "Jingisukan", mutton barbecue originated in Hokkaidō
- Clark Chapel
- Hitsujigaoka Wedding Palace
- Sapporo Snow Festival Museum

== Access ==
- Hokkaido Chuo Bus: 10 minutes from Fukuzumi Station (Tōhō Line) to Hitsujigaoka Tenbodai Bus stop.

== See also ==
- William S. Clark
