= SAPICA =

Contactless smart card system in Sapporo, Japan

SAPICA commuter pass

SAPICA (サピカ, Sapika) is a rechargeable contactless smart card ticketing system for public transport in Sapporo, Japan. Sapporo City Transportation Bureau (SCTB) introduced the system from January 30, 2009. The name of the card means "Sapporo's IC card". Sa' (サッ) is also the sound symbolic word for quickly pulling a card out and pi' (ピッ) is the equivalent of "beep". The card is issued by Sapporo Information Network Company (札幌総合情報センター株式会社, Sapporo Sōgō Jōhō Sentā Kabushiki Gaisha), the third sector (public-private) company of Sapporo City Government.

The integrated service with Kitaca, a smart card system by JR Hokkaidō, was initially considered, but they decided to introduce the different systems because of the technical and financial difficulties. The two operators initially hoped to start an integrated service, but as of February 2020 Sapica still could not be used on JR services.

While SAPICA uses FeliCa NFC technology, just like Suica and Kitaca, SCTB intentionally uses a different system code and encryption key to break compatibility, thus avoiding JR East licensing fees.

From 2001 to 2004, Sapporo Municipal Subway experimented with the rollout of a different smart card called S.M.A.P. Card (S.M.A.P.カード, Sumappu Kādo), which was ultimately scrapped.

== Usable area ==
Interoperation map

As of its introduction on January 30, 2009, the card is usable on Sapporo Municipal Subway Lines, as well as on the Sapporo Streetcar, Hokkaido Chuo Bus, JR Hokkaido Bus and Jotetsu Buses. SAPICA can also be used as a payment card at participating stores and vending machines.

== Types of cards ==
- Unregistered SAPICA: For adults only.
- Registered SAPICA: For adults and children. A card can be reissued when a user lost it.
- SAPICA commuter's pass: For adults and children, with registrations.
