= Makomanai Station =

Subway station in Sapporo, Japan

Coordinates: 42°59′28.255″N 141°21′30.01″E

N16 Makomanai Station 真駒内駅
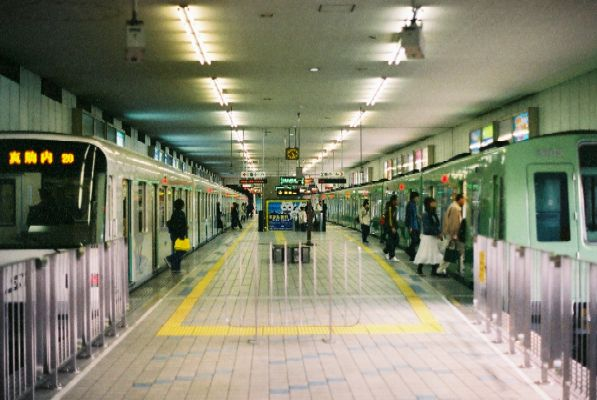
- Station platform before the installation of automatic platform gates

General information
- Location: Minami, Sapporo, Hokkaido; Japan
- System: Sapporo Municipal Subway station
- Operator: Sapporo City Transportation Bureau
- Line: Namboku Line

Construction
- Accessible: Yes

Other information
- Station code: N16

History
- Opened: December 16, 1971; 54 years ago

Services
Preceding station	Sapporo Municipal Subway	Following station
Jieitai-Mae N15 towards Asabu	Namboku Line	Terminus
Location
- Location within Hokkaido Location within Japan

Makomanai Station (真駒内駅) is a rapid transit station in Minami-ku, Sapporo, Hokkaido, Japan. The station number is N16. It is the south terminus of the Namboku Line.

The Makomanai Park is about 10 minutes by bus, or 20 minutes walking distance from the station.

== Platforms ==
1	■ Namboku Line	(Terminal station)
2	■ Namboku Line	for Asabu

== History ==
The station opened on 16 December 1971 coinciding with the opening of the Namboku Line from this station to Kita-Nijuyo-Jo Station.

== Surrounding area ==
- Japan National Route 453 (to Date)
- Minami Ward Office
- Sapporo Salmon Museum
- Makomanai Park
- Makomanai Ice Arena
- Makomanai Open Stadium
- Police station Complex, South Makomanai
- Mieux Cristal shopping center
- Hokkaido Bank, Makomanai
