= Kita-Nijūyo-Jō Station =

Subway station in Sapporo, Japan

Coordinates: 43°5′24.052″N 141°20′41.272″E

N03 Kita-Nijūyo-Jō Station 北24条駅
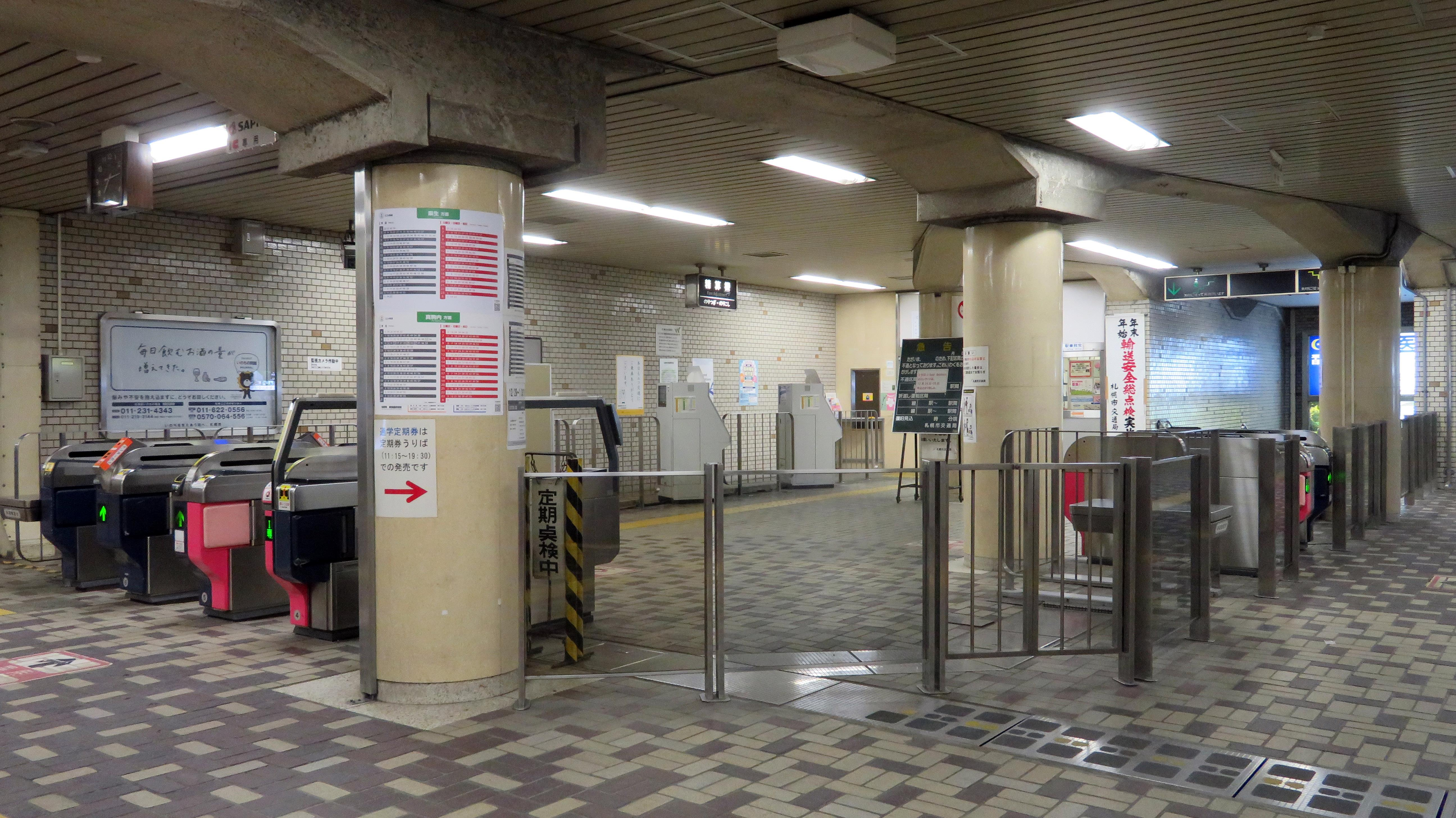
- Ticket gates

General information
- Location: Kita, Sapporo, Hokkaido; Japan
- System: Sapporo Municipal Subway station
- Operator: Sapporo City Transportation Bureau
- Line: Namboku Line

Construction
- Accessible: Yes

Other information
- Station code: N03

History
- Opened: December 16, 1971; 54 years ago

Services
Preceding station	Sapporo Municipal Subway	Following station
Kita-Sanjūyo-Jō N02 towards Asabu	Namboku Line	Kita-Jūhachi-Jō N04 towards Makomanai
Location
- Location within Hokkaido Location within Japan

Kita-Nijūyo-Jō Station (Japanese: 北24条駅; lit. '"North 24th Street Station"') is a Sapporo Municipal Subway station in Kita-ku, Sapporo, Hokkaido, Japan. The station number is N03.

== Platforms ==
1	■ Namboku Line	for Makomanai
2	■ Namboku Line	for Asabu

== History ==
The station opened on 16 December 1971, coinciding with the opening of the Namboku Line from this station to Makomanai Station.

When the Namboku Line extension from Kita-Niju-jo to Asabu Station opened on 16 March 1978, Asabu Station became the new northern terminus for the line.

== Surrounding area ==
- Japan National Route 5, (to Hakodate)
- Kita-Nijūyo-Jō Bus Terminal
- Sapporo Kita Health Center, Sapporo Kita Kumin Center
- Sapporo Kita Ward Office
- Mikaho Gymnasium, (ice rink)
- Sapporo Kita-Nijūyo-Jō Post Office
- Police Station, Kita-Nijūyo-Jō Post
- Sapporo City Kita Fire Department
- Round One, Amusement Center
- ARCS super store, Kita-Nijūyo-Jō branch
- Maxvalu Supermarket, Kita branch
- Sapporo Sun Plaza, Hotel
- Sorachi Shinkin Bank, Sapporo Kita branch
- Engaru Shinkin Bank, Sapporo branch
- North Pacific Bank, Kita-Nijūyo-Jō branch
- Hokkaido Bank, Kita-Nijūyo-Jō branch
