= Asabu Station =

Subway station in Sapporo, Japan

Coordinates: 43°6′32.98″N 141°20′17.71″E

N01 Asabu Station 麻生駅
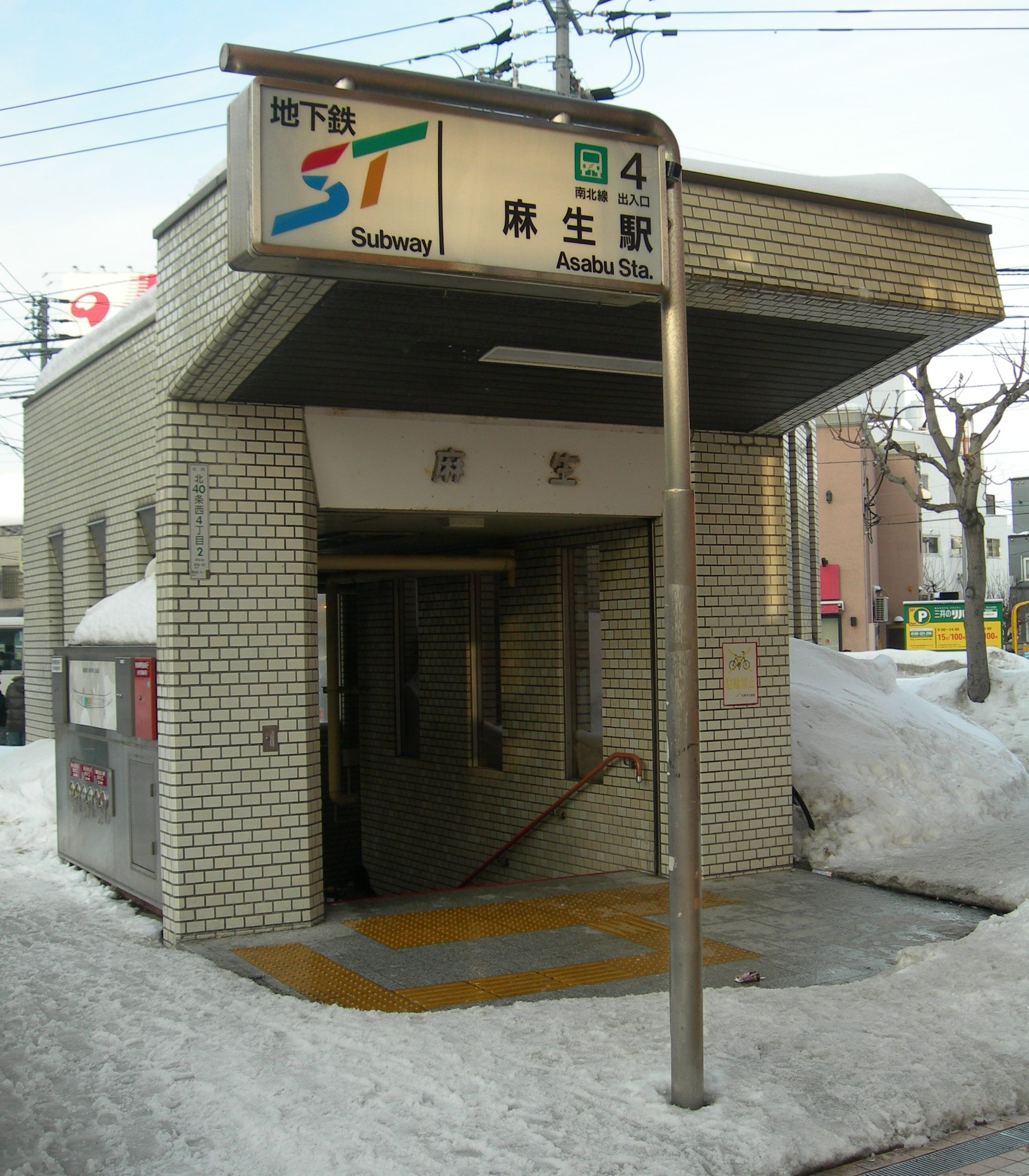
- Asabu Station entrance in March 2008

General information
- Location: Kita-ku, Sapporo, Hokkaido; Japan
- System: Sapporo Municipal Subway station
- Operator: Sapporo City Transportation Bureau
- Line: Namboku Line
- Platforms: 1 island platform
- Tracks: 2
- Connections: JR Hokkaido (Shin-Kotoni)

Construction
- Accessible: Yes

Other information
- Station code: N01

History
- Opened: 1978; 48 years ago

Services
Preceding station	Sapporo Municipal Subway	Following station
Terminus	Namboku Line	Kita-Sanjūyo-Jō N02 towards Makomanai
Location
- Location within Hokkaido Location within Japan

Asabu Station (麻生駅, Asabu-eki) is a railway station on the Namboku Line in Kita-ku, Sapporo, Hokkaido, Japan, operated by the Sapporo Municipal Subway. The station is numbered N01.

While situated relatively close to Shin-Kotoni Station on the Sasshō Line, there are no transfer passageways between the two stations. Passengers who are trying to reach Shin-Kotoni must take Exit 3 and from the station walk outside for 200m.

== Lines ==
Asabu Station is served by the Namboku Line, and forms the northern terminus of the line. From 1 April to 31 July every year, Platform 1 serves departing southbound trains, with trains arriving at Platform 2 immediately going out of service before going to a turn-around point beyond the station. From 1 August through 31 March, both platforms serve arriving and departing trains in sequence.

== Platforms ==
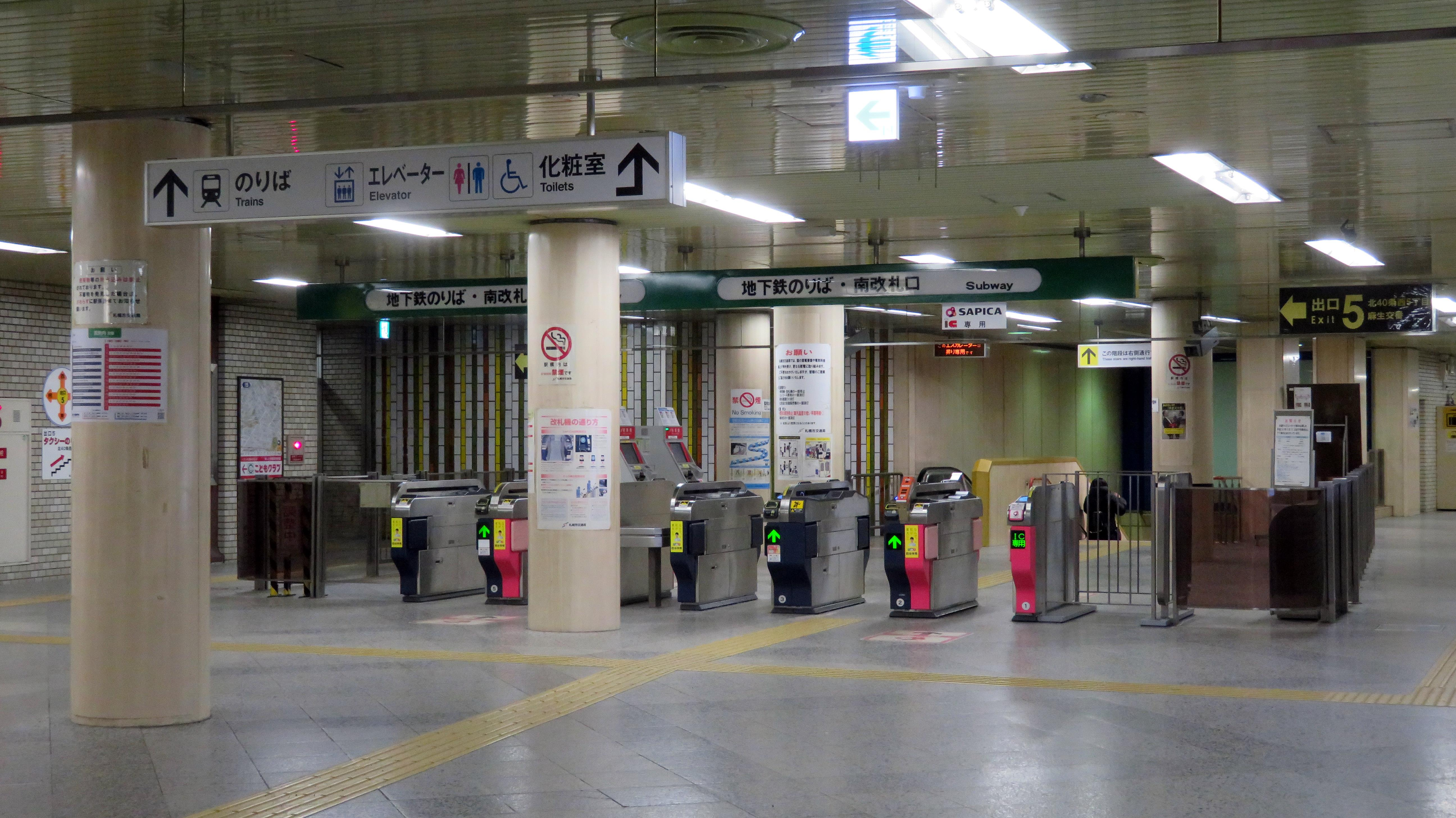
Ticket gates

1	■ Namboku Line	for Makomanai
2	■ Namboku Line (August 1st to March 31st only)	for Makomanai

== History ==
The station opened on 16 March 1978, coinciding with the opening of the Namboku Line extension from this station to Kita-Nijūyo-Jō Station.

== Surrounding area ==
- Shin-Kotoni Station (Sasshō Line)
- National Route 231
- Sapporo Asabu Baseball Stadium
- Sapporo Kita Ward Gymnasium
- Kita ward, Shin Kotoni Community Center
- North Asabu Police Station
- Sapporo Asabu Post Office

== See also ==
- List of railway stations in Japan
