= Sapporo Municipal Subway =

Rubber-tired rail system in Japan

Overview
- Native name: 札幌市営地下鉄; Sapporo Shiei Chikatetsu
- Locale: Sapporo, Hokkaido, Japan
- Transit type: Rapid transit/Rubber-tyred metro
- Number of lines: 3
- Number of stations: 49
- Daily ridership: 630,000 (2024 estimate)
- Annual ridership: 217 million

Operation
- Began operation: 16 December 1971; 54 years ago
- Operator: Sapporo City Transportation Bureau

Technical
- System length: 48.0 km (29.8 mi)
- Track gauge: Namboku line: Central and side-mounted guideways, with rubber tires; Tōzai and Tōhō lines: Central guideway with rubber tires
- Electrification: Namboku line: 750 V DC third rail; Tōzai and Tōhō lines: 1,500 V DC overhead catenary
- Top speed: 70 km/h (43 mph)
System map
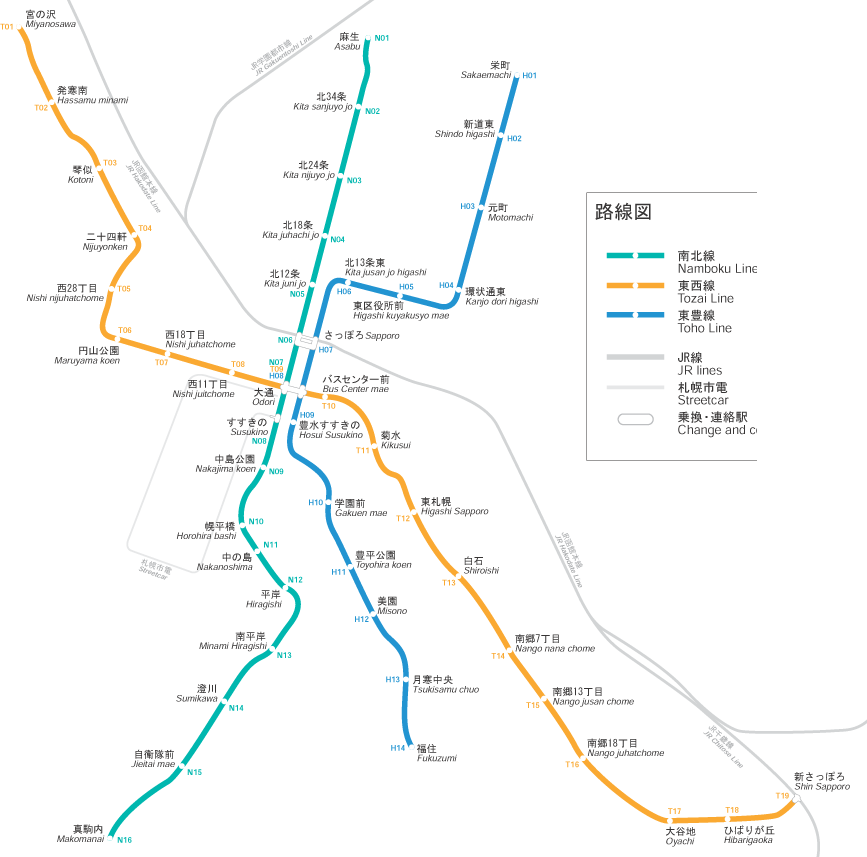

The Sapporo Municipal Subway (札幌市営地下鉄, Sapporo Shiei Chikatetsu) is a rubber-tired rapid transit system in Sapporo, Hokkaido, Japan. Operated by the Sapporo City Transportation Bureau, it is the only subway system on the island of Hokkaido, and also the country's only subway system that is entirely rubber-tired.

== Lines ==
The system consists of three lines: the green Namboku Line (North–South line), orange Tozai Line (East–West line), and blue Tōhō Line (East-Toyohira line). The first, the Namboku Line, was opened in 1971, prior to the 1972 Winter Olympics. The Sapporo City Subway system operates out of two main hubs: Sapporo Station and Ōdōri Station. Most areas of the city are within a reasonable walking distance or short bus ride from one of the subway stations.

The three lines all connect at Ōdōri Station. The Namboku and Tōhō lines connect with the JR Hokkaido main lines at Sapporo Station, and with the streetcar (tram) above at Ōdōri and Susukino stations. The system has a total length of 48 km (30 mi) with 49 stations. Except for the section of the Namboku Line south of Hiragishi Station, tracks and stations are all underground. The aforementioned above-ground section is entirely covered, including stations, depot access tracks, and the depot south of Jieitai-Mae Station.

In 2024, the system had a daily ridership of 630,000.

Line color	Line icon	Mark	Line	Name	First Opened	Last Extension	Length	Stations	Train Length
Green		N	Namboku Line	North-South Line	1971	1978	14.3 km (8.9 mi)	16	6 cars
Orange		T	Tōzai Line	East-West Line	1976	1999	20.1 km (12.5 mi)	19	7 cars
Blue		H	Tōhō Line	Higashi-Toyohira Line	1988	1994	13.6 km (8.5 mi)	14	4 cars
Total:							48.0 km (29.8 mi)	49	

== Technology ==
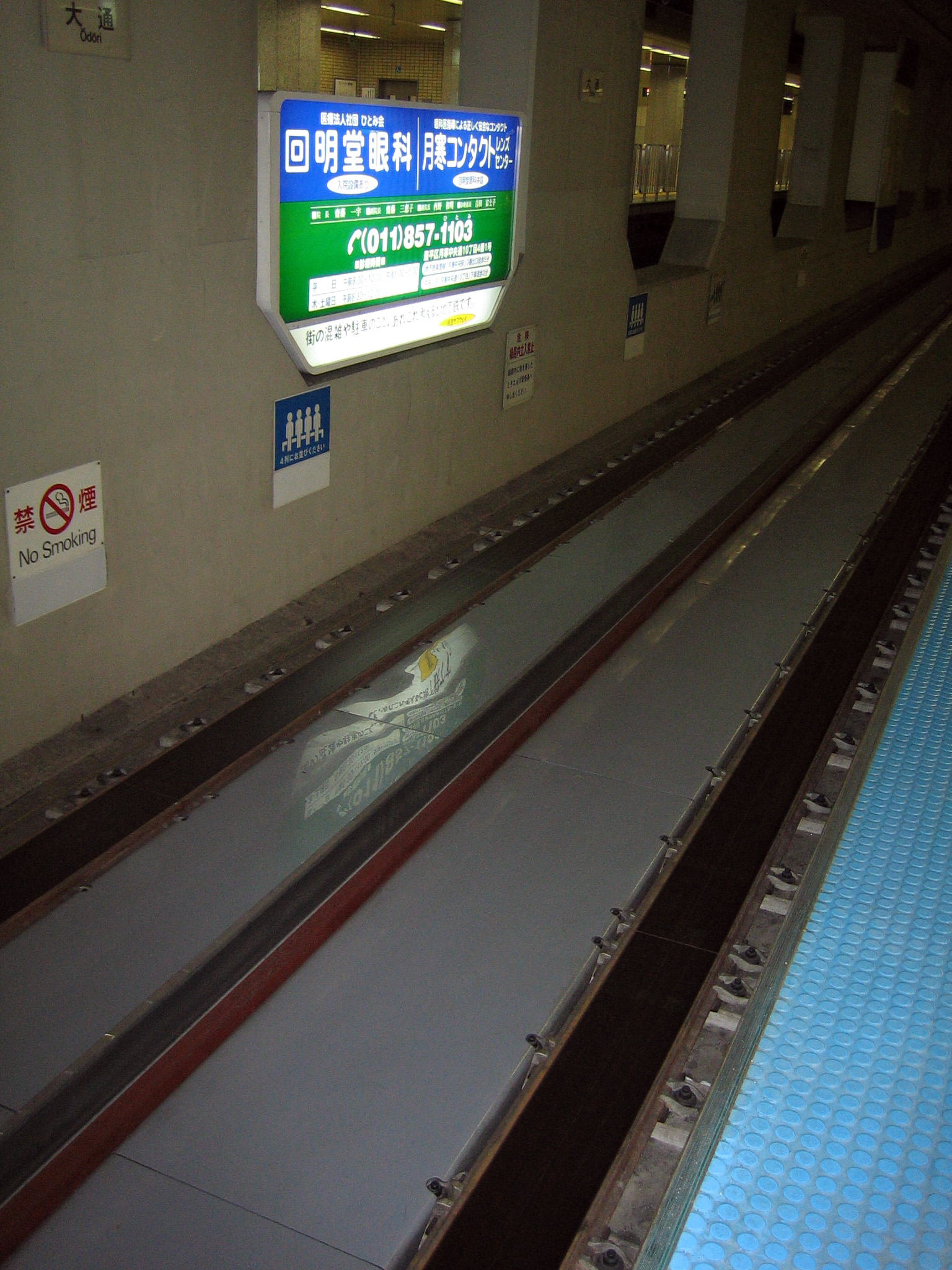
Sapporo Subway guide rail and flat steel roll ways

All lines of the subway use rubber-tired trains that travel on two flat roll ways, guided by a single central rail. This system is unique among subways in Japan and the rest of the world; while other rubber-tired metro networks, including smaller automated guideway transit lines such as the Port Liner, use guide bars, the Sapporo system does not because the central rail makes them superfluous (similar to some rubber-tyred trams, such as the Translohr and Bombardier Guided Light Transit). This rubber-tired system, combined with the heavy snowfall that Sapporo gets during winter, means that the system must be fully enclosed (including the southern elevated segment of the Namboku line); as a result, rolling stock cannot be fitted with air conditioning as it would otherwise trap hot air in the tunnels. Hence, all trains are equipped with fans and run with windows open to provide ventilation.

There are differences between the technology used on the older Namboku Line and the newer Tōzai and Tōhō Lines. The Namboku Line uses a T-shaped guide rail, double tires, and third rail power collection, while the Tōzai and Tōhō Lines use an I-shaped guide rail, single tires, and overhead line power collection. The surface of the roll ways is constructed of resin (on the entirety of the Namboku Line and the central section of the Tōzai Line) and steel (on the outer sections of the Tōzai Line and the entirety of the Tōhō Line).

== Rolling stock ==
=== Current roilling stock ===
==== Namboku Line ====
5000 series (6-car formation with 4 doors per side, since 1997)

==== Tōzai Line ====
Sapporo Municipal Subway 8000 series (7-car formation with 3 doors per side, since 1998)

==== Tōhō Line ====
9000 series (4-car formation with 3 doors per side, since May 2015)

=== Former rolling stock ===
==== Namboku Line ====
- 1000/2000 series (2/4/6/8-car formation with 2 doors per side, from 1971 until 1999)
- 3000 series (8-car formation with 2 doors per side, from 1978 until 2012)

==== Tōzai Line ====
6000 series (7-car formation with 3 doors per side, from 1976 until 2008)

==== Tōhō Line ====
- 7000 series (4-car formation with 3 doors per side, from 1988 until 2016)

=== Rolling stock gallery ===
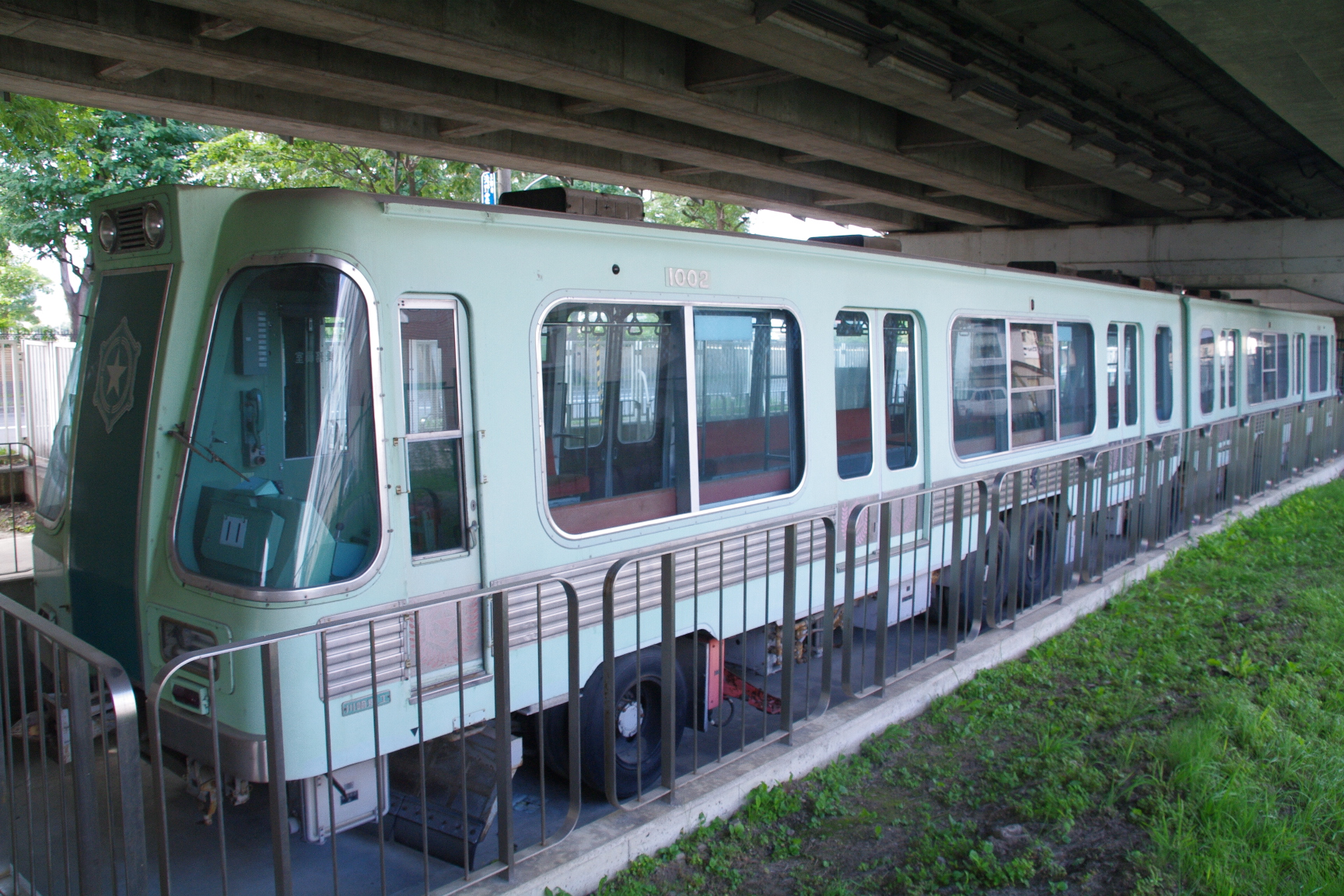
1000 series (preserved)

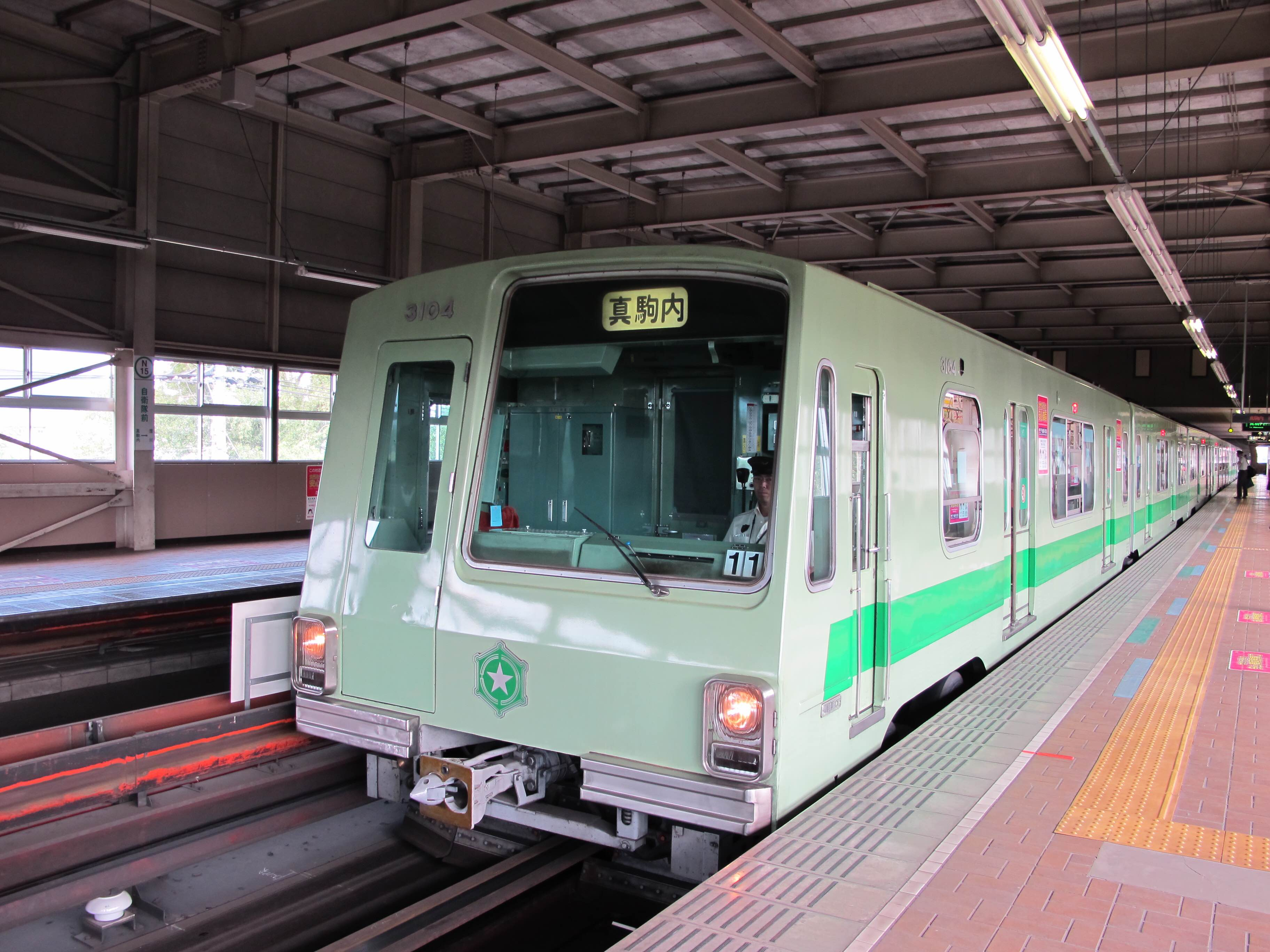
3000 series

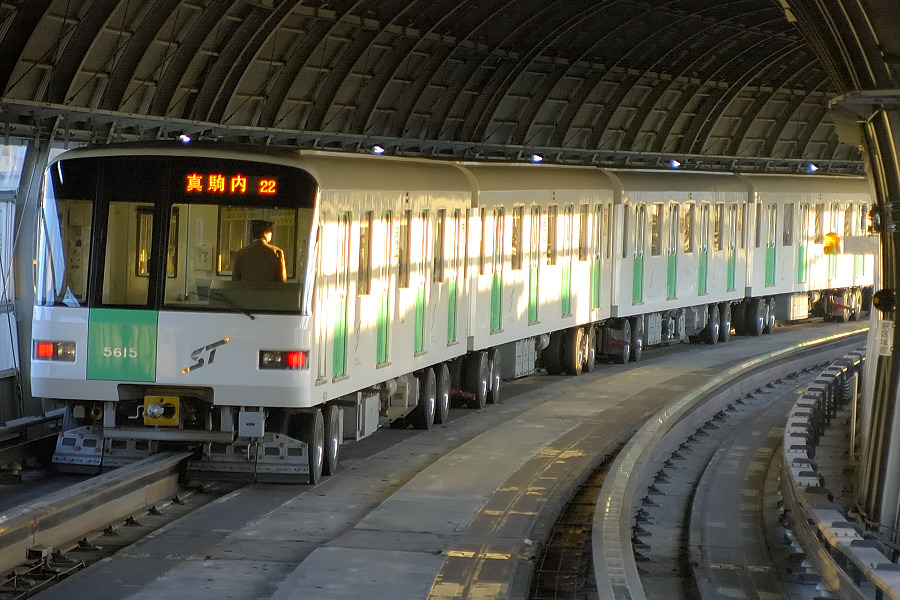
5000 series

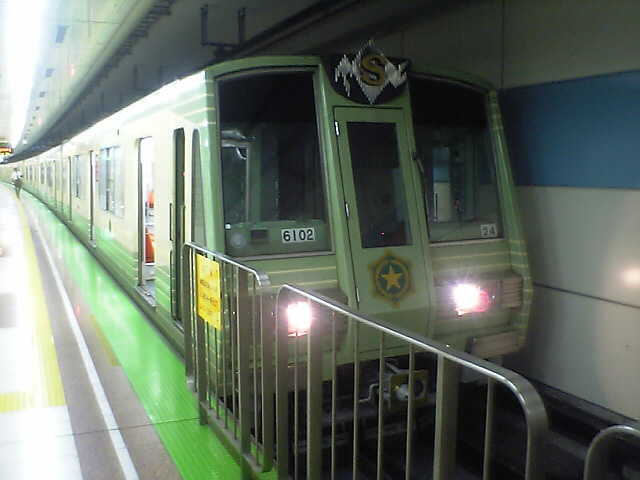
6000 series

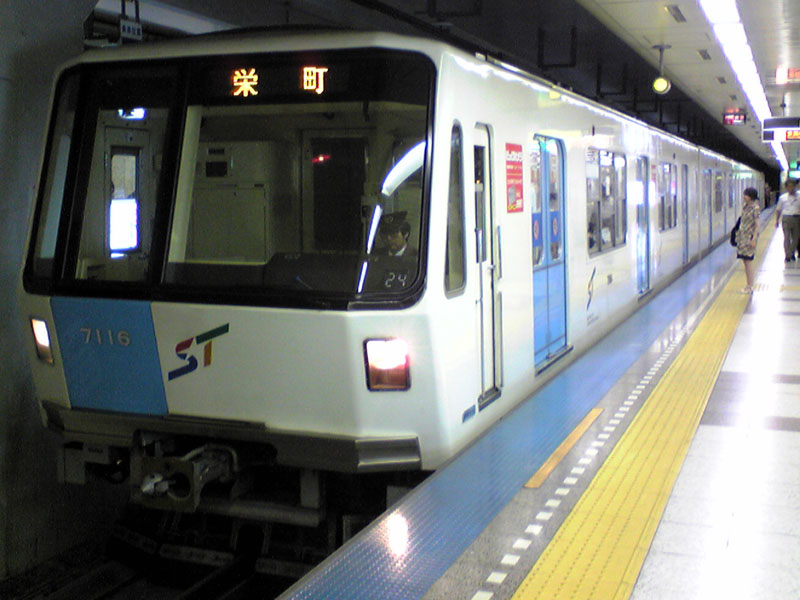
7000 series

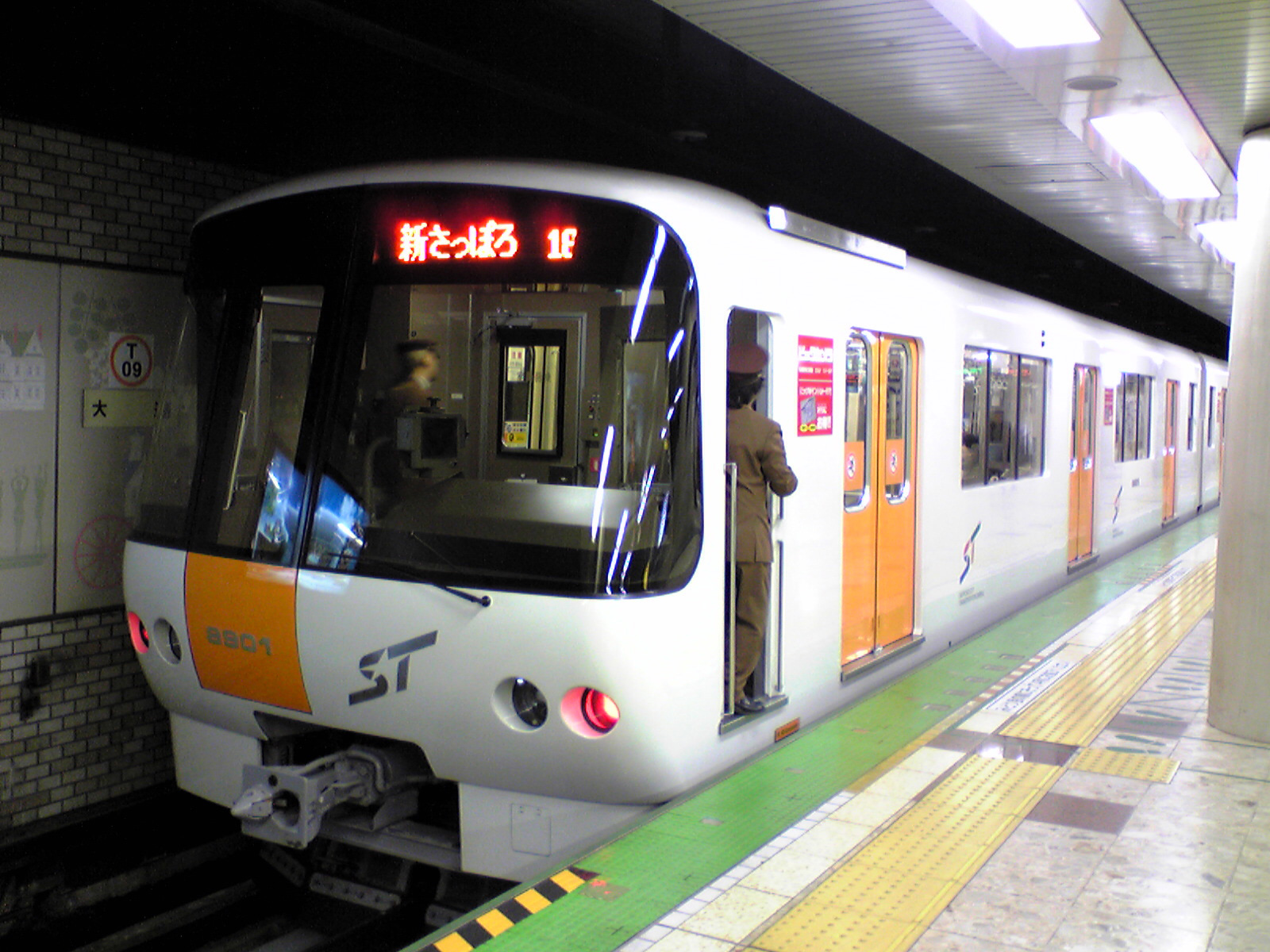
8000 series

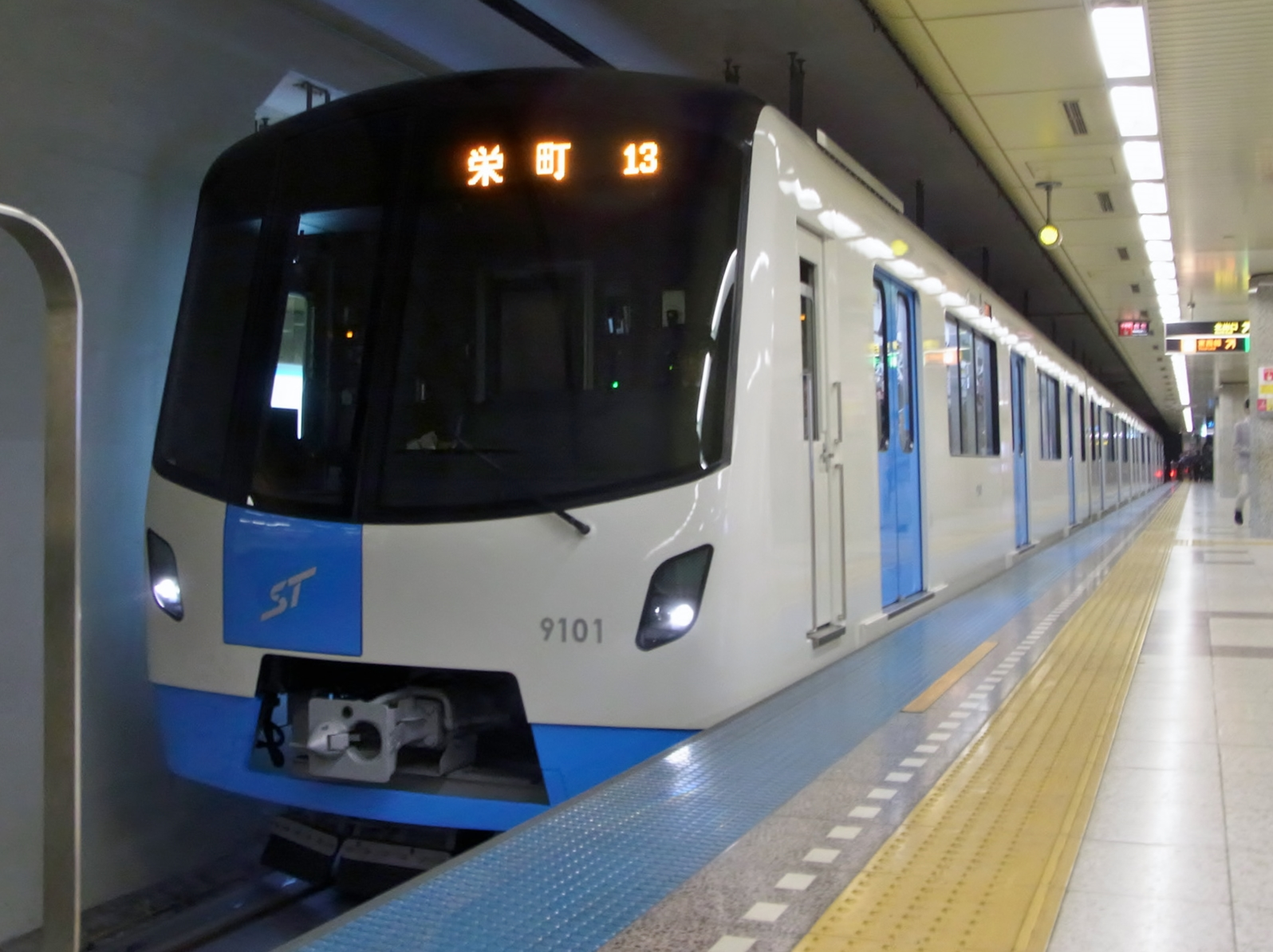
9000 series

== Fares ==
Ticket prices range from 210 yen to 380 yen, depending on the distance to travel. All stations accept SAPICA, rechargeable IC cards which can be used as a fare card for the subway.

Kitaca, a contactless smart card issued by JR Hokkaido, is also usable on the Sapporo Municipal Subway, as well as IC cards part of the Nationwide Mutual Usage Service (e.g. Suica and Pasmo). However, this compatibility is unidirectional; SAPICA cannot be used on other rail networks.

Day passes and discount passes can be purchased at ticket vending machines in stations. Prior to its discontinuation on 31 March 2015, prepaid "With You" magnetic cards could be used for the subway, streetcar and regular city routes offered by JR Hokkaido Bus, Hokkaido Chuo Bus, and Jotetsu Bus. Magnetic card functionality was superseded by SAPICA.

The Sapporo City Transportation Bureau sells a one-day ticket for subway use (地下鉄専用1日乗車券), which allows unlimited rides on the subway for one day; it costs 830 yen for adults.

A subway one-day card, for use only on the subway, is also available for 830 yen. Donichika tickets (ドニチカキップ, donichika kippu, a portmanteau of 土日 donichi meaning "Saturday and Sunday" and 地下 chika meaning "underground") allow for unlimited one-day ride pass for the subway, and are only available on weekends and national holidays; they are sold for a lower price of 520 yen. Due to their identical functionality, subway one-day cards are unavailable on days where Donichika tickets are sold. Both are able to be purchased with cash only.

Commuter passes, able to be loaded onto SAPICA, offer unlimited rides between specific stations during their period of validity. There are two types of commuter pass: one for those commuting to workplaces and one for students. Both are available for one-month or three-month periods, and can be newly purchased from commuter pass sales offices located at major stations. Standard SAPICA cards may be upgraded to a commuter pass through ticket vending machines. Commuter SAPICA cards automatically downgrade to standard SAPICA cards once the time period expires.

Since 26 April 2025, EMV contactless credit cards can also be used as a ticket, powered by stera transit, a transit ticketing system from SMBC. To access usage history, riders must register for an account with Q-Move by QUADRAC.

== Shopping areas ==
There are two main shopping areas located underground, connected to the exits of three central stations on the Namboku line: Sapporo Station, Susukino Station, and Ōdōri Station. Pole Town is an extensive shopping area that lies between Susukino and Ōdōri stations. Aurora Town is a shopping arcade connected to Sapporo Station, linking some of the main shopping malls in the city, such as Daimaru, JR Tower, and Stellar Place.

In addition to the underground shopping corridors, an underground walkway also connects Ōdōri Station to Bus Center-Mae station and its neighboring bus center. There are a few stores in this walkway.
