= Sapporo City Transportation Bureau =

Transportation bureau in Sapporo, Japan

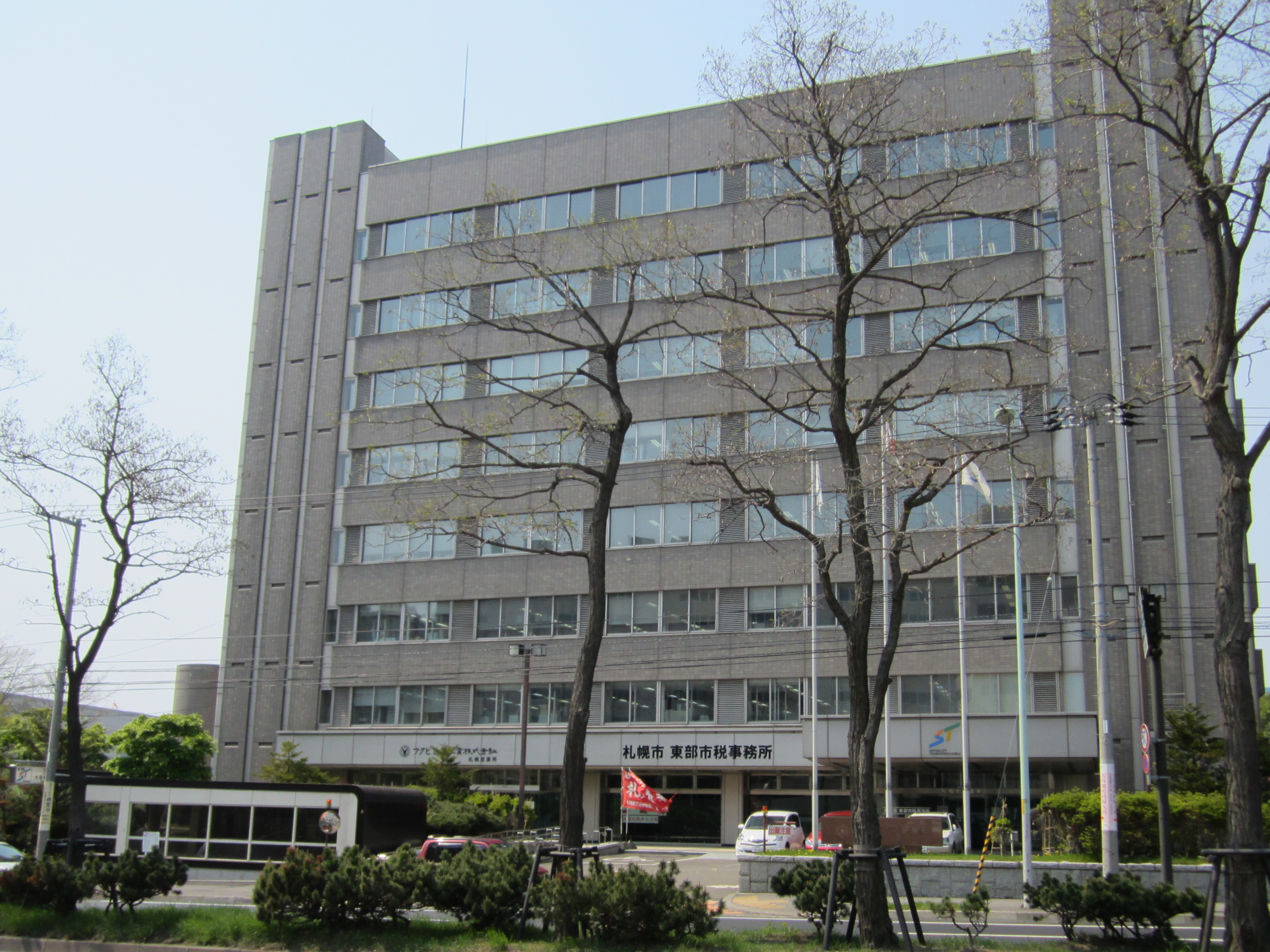
- Sapporo City Transportation Bureau headquarters
- Native name: 札幌市交通局
- Romanized name: Sapporo-shi Kōtsū-kyoku
- Company type: Transportation authority
- Industry: Transportation
- Founded: 1 December 1927
- Headquarters: Atsubetsu, Sapporo, Japan
- Website: city.sapporo.jp

Sapporo City Transportation Bureau (札幌市交通局, Sapporo-shi Kōtsū-kyoku) is a public organization of transportation in Sapporo, Japan. The organization operates subways and a tram. It was founded in 1927, when the city took private tram lines. The bureau also started to operate bus lines from 1930, subways from 1971. However, from 1990s, the bureau has been suffering from huge deficits. It handed over its bus lines to a private operator in 2004. The bureau introduced a smart card called SAPICA on January 30, 2009.

== Transportations ==
- Sapporo Municipal Subway
- Sapporo Street Car
