= 1994 in rail transport =

This article lists events related to rail transport that occurred in 1994.

== Events ==
=== January events ===
- January 1 - Rail Management Corporation takes over operations of the Atlanta and St. Andrews Bay Railroad.
- January 1 - Railroad Services takes over operations of the now 5 year old Abbeville-Grimes Railway, renaming it to A&G Railroad.
- January 1 - Deutsche Reichsbahn and Deutsche Bundesbahn are merged to form Deutsche Bahn.
- January 9 - The Chicago Transit Authority closes its Green Line rail service on the west and south sides of Chicago, for a 2 year rehabilitation project.
- January 24 - Following the Northridge earthquake one week prior, an extension of the Metrolink Antelope Valley Line opens to Lancaster to provide traffic relief, as several local freeways had collapsed. New stations were constructed in three days, with further infill stations built in the following weeks.

=== April events ===
- April 1 - Management of the British Rail infrastructure is taken over by Railtrack.

=== May events ===
- May 6 - The Channel Tunnel linking England and France officially opens.
- May 26 - LGV Interconnexion Est opens in Paris suburbs.

=== June events ===
- June 25 - Vandals place concrete blocks on a railway line at Greenock, Scotland, causing the Greenock rail crash. The train driver is killed along with one passenger.

=== July events ===
- July 3 - Gare de Satolas (designed by Santiago Calatrava) opens at Lyon on LGV Rhône-Alpes.
- July 15 - Kansai Airport Line and Nankai Airport Line open, for the access route of Kansai International Airport, before their formal opening on September 4.

=== August events ===
- August 3 - Amtrak's Lake Shore Limited passenger train derails near Batavia, New York, while traveling at 75 mph (120.7 km/h), injuring 125 of the train's passengers and crew members.
- August 8 - Astram Line open between Hondori and Koiki-koen-mae in the new transit system of Hiroshima, Japan.
- August 22 - Indian Railways orders the first WDC-2 locomotives.
- August 26 - The Dominion Atlantic Railway operates its last train, just a month short of its centenary.

=== September events ===
- September 22 - New York City's Metropolitan Transportation Authority begins construction on the 63rd Street Connector which connects the 63rd Street Tunnel to the Queens Boulevard Line.
- September 30 - The last trains run on the London Underground's Holborn to Aldwych shuttle branch (Piccadilly line) and Epping to Ongar via North Weald shuttle branch (Central line).

=== October events ===
- October 14 - The Tōhō Line of subway in Sapporo, Japan, is extended from Hōsui-Susukino to Fukuzumi Station.
- October 7 - The Regional Transportation District in Denver, Colorado opens the first line of its light rail system.
- October 13 - Official inauguration of Eurostar service between Brussels and London via the Channel Tunnel by King Albert II and Queen Paola of Belgium.

=== November events ===
- November 6 - Bražuolė bridge bombing in Lithuania damages a railway bridge but trains are stopped in time to avoid casualties.
- November 14 - First commercial Eurostar services Brussels<>London and Paris<>London via the Channel Tunnel.
- November 30 - Alaska Railroad, which lacks a direct rail connection with the rest of the North American rail network, brings a 700-foot (213 m) long railgrinder to Alaska by ship at a cost of $1.2 million to service the company's tracks.

=== December events ===
- December 3 - In Japan, Chizu Express, Chizu and Kamigori route open, with Kyoto to Tottori of direct Super Hakuto Express train to start.
- December 13 - The Interstate Commerce Commission grants the Union Pacific Railroad authority to exercise management control over the Chicago and North Western Railway.
- December 14 - A runaway Santa Fe freight train rear ends a Union Pacific train at the bottom of Cajon Pass, California.
- December 16 - Last run of Via Rail Atlantic Limited passenger service through Maine between Montreal and the Maritimes.
- December 21 - A homemade bomb explodes on the New York City Subway #4 train at Fulton Street.
- December 31 - Burlington Northern Railroad operates the last freight train on the former Oregon Electric Railway mainline in Portland, Oregon; the mainline is to become part of the new TriMet light rail system.

=== Unknown date events ===
- Norfolk Southern ends railroad-sponsored steam excursions.
- Towards the end of the year, regular use of steam locomotives on the Janakpur Railway, Nepal, is abandoned following the transfer of 2 ft 6 in (762 mm) narrow gauge diesel locomotives from Indian Railways.

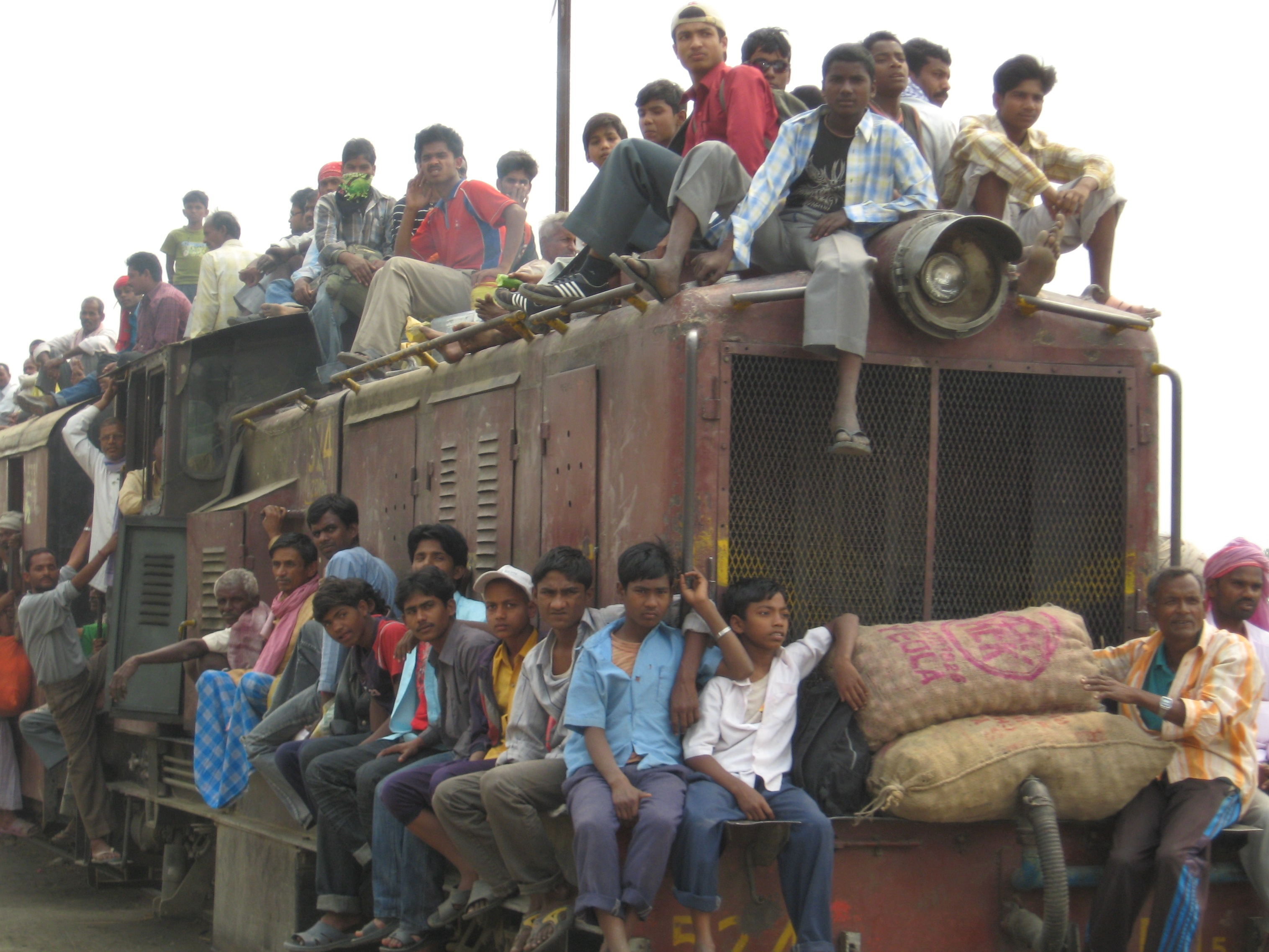
Nepalese diesel

== Deaths ==
=== May deaths ===
- May 14 - W. Graham Claytor Jr., president of Amtrak 1982–1993 (b. 1912).

=== September deaths ===
- September 21 - Oswald Nock, English railway author and signalling engineer (b. 1905).
