= Kanjō-Dōri-Higashi Station =

Subway station in Sapporo, Japan

Coordinates: 43°4′55.598″N 141°22′28.353″E

H04 Kanjō-Dōri-Higashi Station 環状通東駅
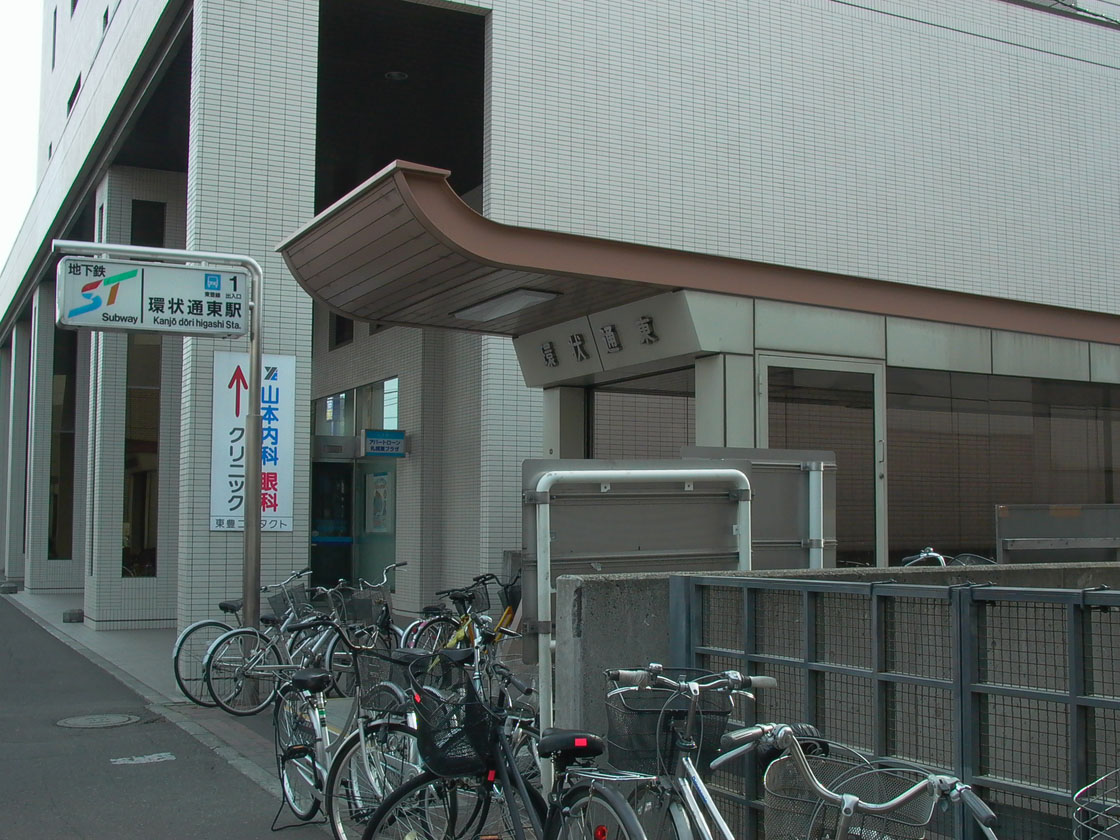
- Station exit 1

General information
- Location: Higashi, Sapporo, Hokkaido; Japan
- System: Sapporo Municipal Subway station
- Operator: Sapporo City Transportation Bureau
- Line: Tōhō Line

Construction
- Accessible: Yes

Other information
- Station code: H04

History
- Opened: 2 December 1988; 37 years ago

Services
Preceding station	Sapporo Municipal Subway	Following station
Motomachi H03 towards Sakaemachi	Tōhō Line	Higashi-Kuyakusho-Mae H05 towards Fukuzumi
Location

Kanjō-Dōri-Higashi Station (環状通東駅) is a Sapporo Municipal Subway in Higashi-ku, Sapporo, Hokkaido, Japan. The station number is H04.

== Platforms ==
1	■ Tōhō Line	for Fukuzumi
2	■ Tōhō Line	for Sakaemachi

== History ==
The station opened on 2 December 1988 coinciding with the opening of the Toho Line from Sakaemachi Station to Hōsui-Susukino Station.
