= Toyohira-Kōen Station =

Subway station in Sapporo, Japan

Coordinates: 43°2′30.800″N 141°22′35.674″E

H11 Toyohira-Kōen Station 豊平公園駅
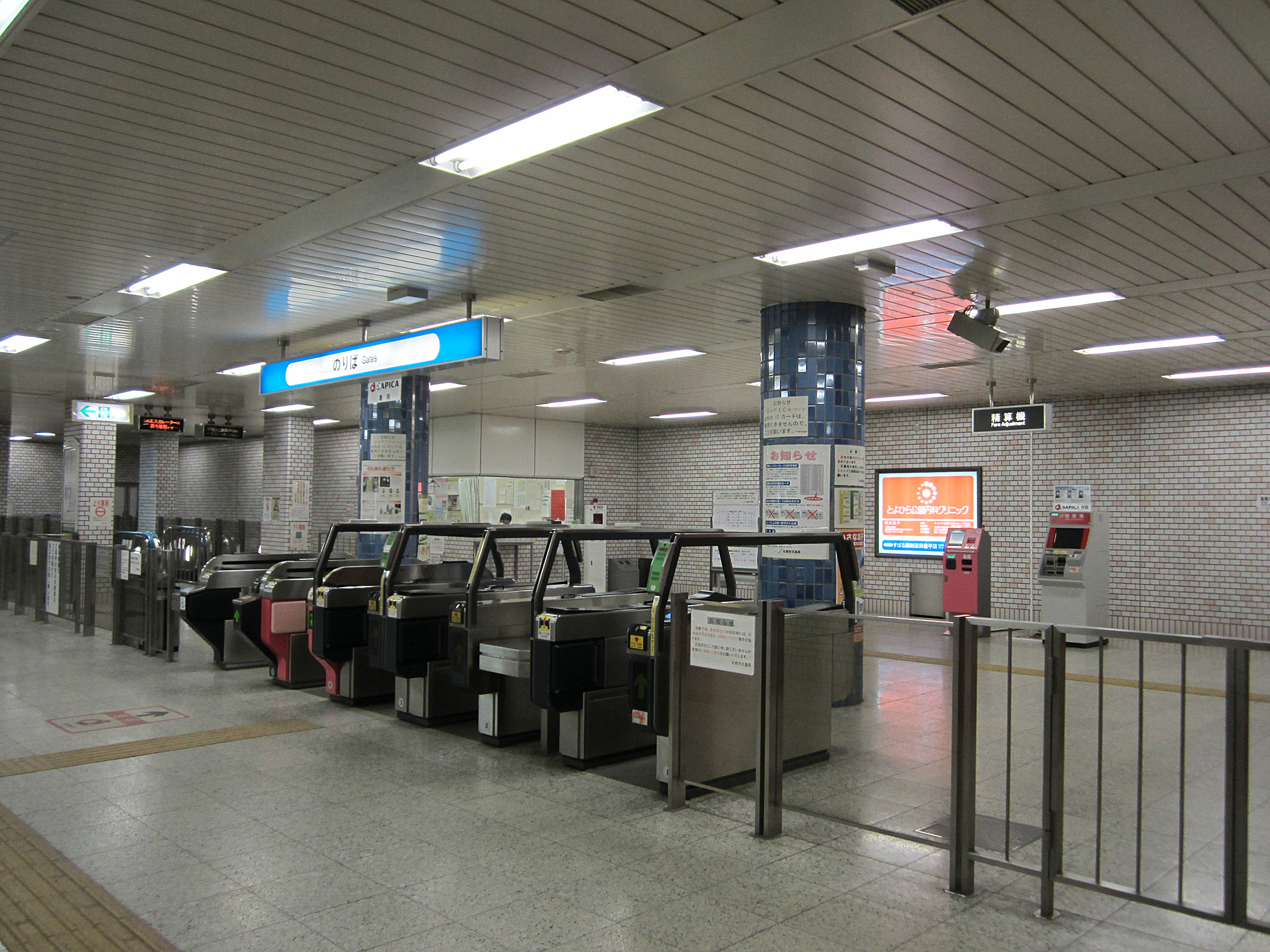
- Station ticket gates

General information
- Location: Toyohira, Sapporo, Hokkaido; Japan
- System: Sapporo Municipal Subway station
- Operator: Sapporo City Transportation Bureau
- Line: Tōhō Line

Construction
- Accessible: Yes

Other information
- Station code: H11

History
- Opened: 1994; 32 years ago

Services
Preceding station	Sapporo Municipal Subway	Following station
Gakuen-Mae H10 towards Sakaemachi	Tōhō Line	Misono H12 towards Fukuzumi
Location

Toyohira-Kōen Station (豊平公園駅, Toyohirakōen-eki) is a subway station on the Tōhō Line in Toyohira-ku, Sapporo, Hokkaido, Japan, operated by Sapporo Municipal Subway. The station is numbered H11.

The station takes its name from Toyohira Park, located nearby.

== Platforms ==
1	■ Tōhō Line	for Fukuzumi
2	■ Tōhō Line	for Sakaemachi

== History ==
The station opened on 14 October 1994 coinciding with the opening of the Toho Line extension from Hōsui-Susukino Station to Fukuzumi Station.

== Surrounding area ==
- Japan National Route 36 (to Muroran)
- Toyohira Park
- Hokkaido Prefectural Sports Center, (connected directly by an underground passage)
