= Motomachi Station (Hokkaido) =

Subway station in Sapporo, Japan

Coordinates: 43°5′40.042″N 141°22′17.76″E

H03 Motomachi Station 元町駅
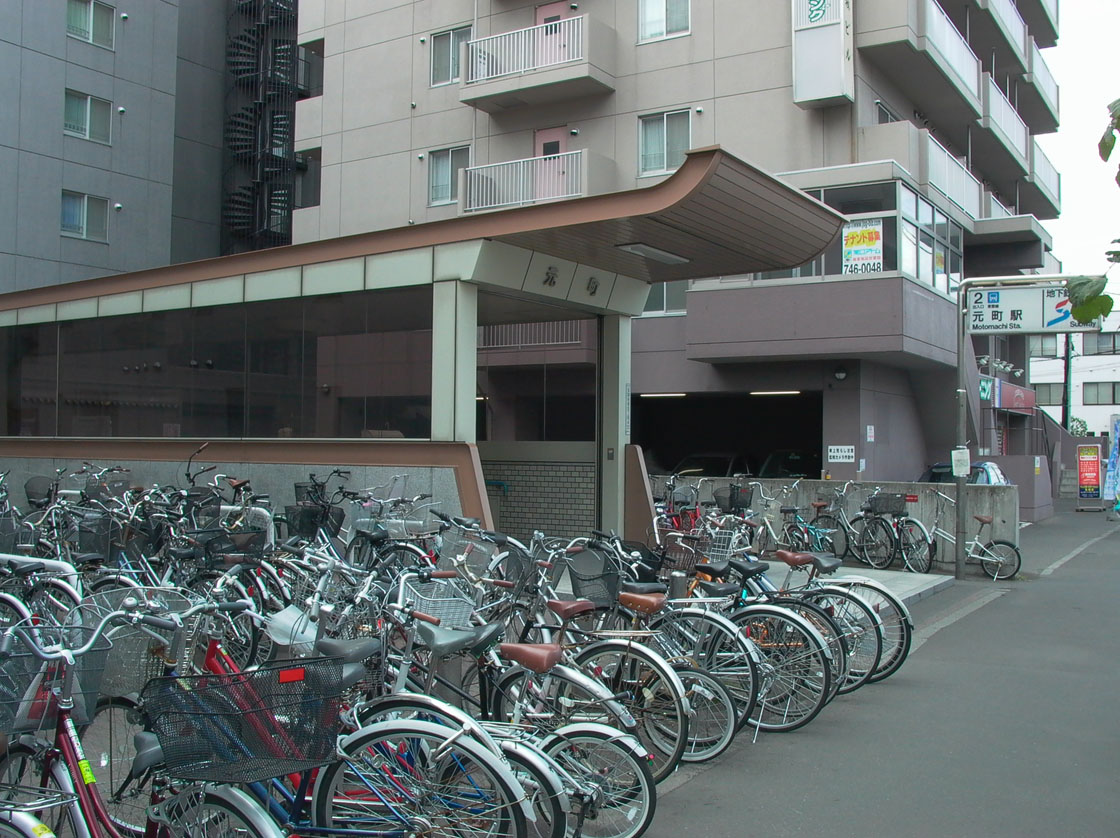
- Station exit 2

General information
- Location: Higashi, Sapporo, Hokkaido; Japan
- System: Sapporo Municipal Subway station
- Operator: Sapporo City Transportation Bureau
- Line: Tōhō Line

Construction
- Accessible: Yes

Other information
- Station code: H03

History
- Opened: 2 December 1988; 37 years ago

Passengers
- FY2023: 18,352 (daily)

Services
Preceding station	Sapporo Municipal Subway	Following station
Shindō-Higashi H02 towards Sakaemachi	Tōhō Line	Kanjō-Dōri-Higashi H04 towards Fukuzumi
Location

Motomachi Station (元町駅) is a Sapporo Municipal Subway in Higashi-ku, Sapporo, Hokkaido, Japan. The station number is H03.

== Platforms ==
1	■ Tōhō Line	for Fukuzumi
2	■ Tōhō Line	for Sakaemachi

== History ==
The station opened on 2 December 1988 coinciding with the opening of the Toho Line from Sakaemachi Station to Hōsui-Susukino Station.

== Passenger statistics ==
During FY2023, the station was used on average by 18,352 passengers daily. (Note: Data published by the Ministry of Land, Infrastructure, Transport and Tourism state the number of passengers boarding and disembarking by station in a given year. FY2023 covers the period from 1 April 2023 to 31 March 2024. Data published by individual railways directly may state the number boarding only.)
