= Misono Station =

Subway station in Sapporo, Japan

Coordinates: 43°2′10.698″N 141°23′9.36″E

H12 Misono Station 美園駅
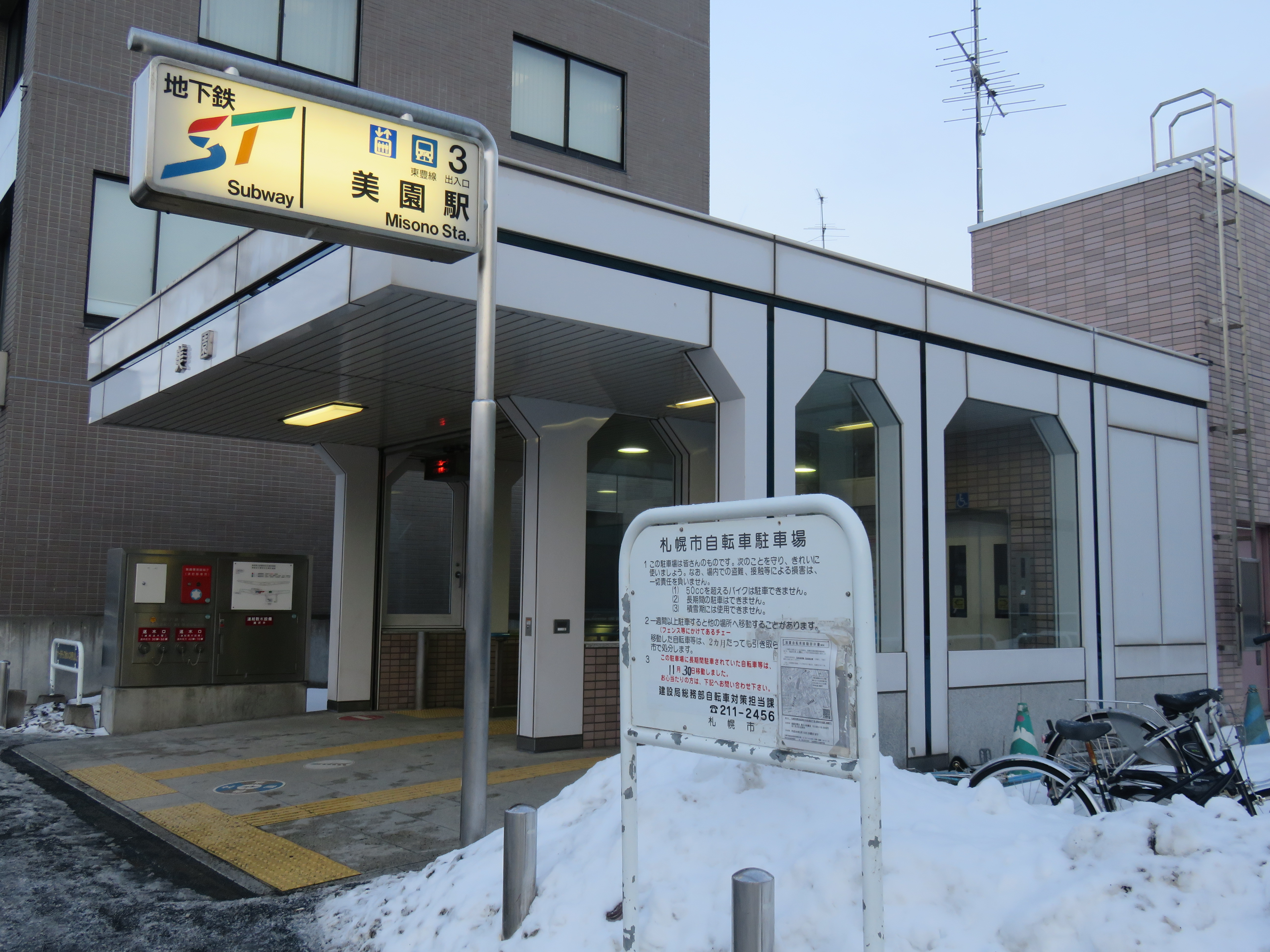

General information
- Location: Toyohira, Sapporo, Hokkaido; Japan
- System: Sapporo Municipal Subway
- Operator: Sapporo City Transportation Bureau
- Line: Tōhō Line

Construction
- Accessible: Yes

Other information
- Station code: H12

History
- Opened: 14 October 1994; 31 years ago

Services
Preceding station	Sapporo Municipal Subway	Following station
Toyohira-Kōen H11 towards Sakaemachi	Tōhō Line	Tsukisamu-Chūō H13 towards Fukuzumi
Location

Misono Station (美園駅) is a metro station in Toyohira-ku, Sapporo, Hokkaido, Japan. The station number is H12. It is located in the Tōhō Line.

The Tsukisamu Park is about 8 minutes walking distance from the station.

== Platforms ==
1	■ Tōhō Line	for Fukuzumi
2	■ Tōhō Line	for Sakaemachi

== History ==
The station opened on 14 October 1994 coinciding with the opening of the Toho Line extension from Hōsui-Susukino Station to Fukuzumi Station.

== Surrounding area ==
- Japan National Route 36 (to Muroran)
