= Sapporo Station (Sapporo Municipal Subway) =

Subway station in Sapporo, Japan

Coordinates: 43°3′59.246″N 141°21′1.83″E

N06 H07 Sapporo Station さっぽろ駅
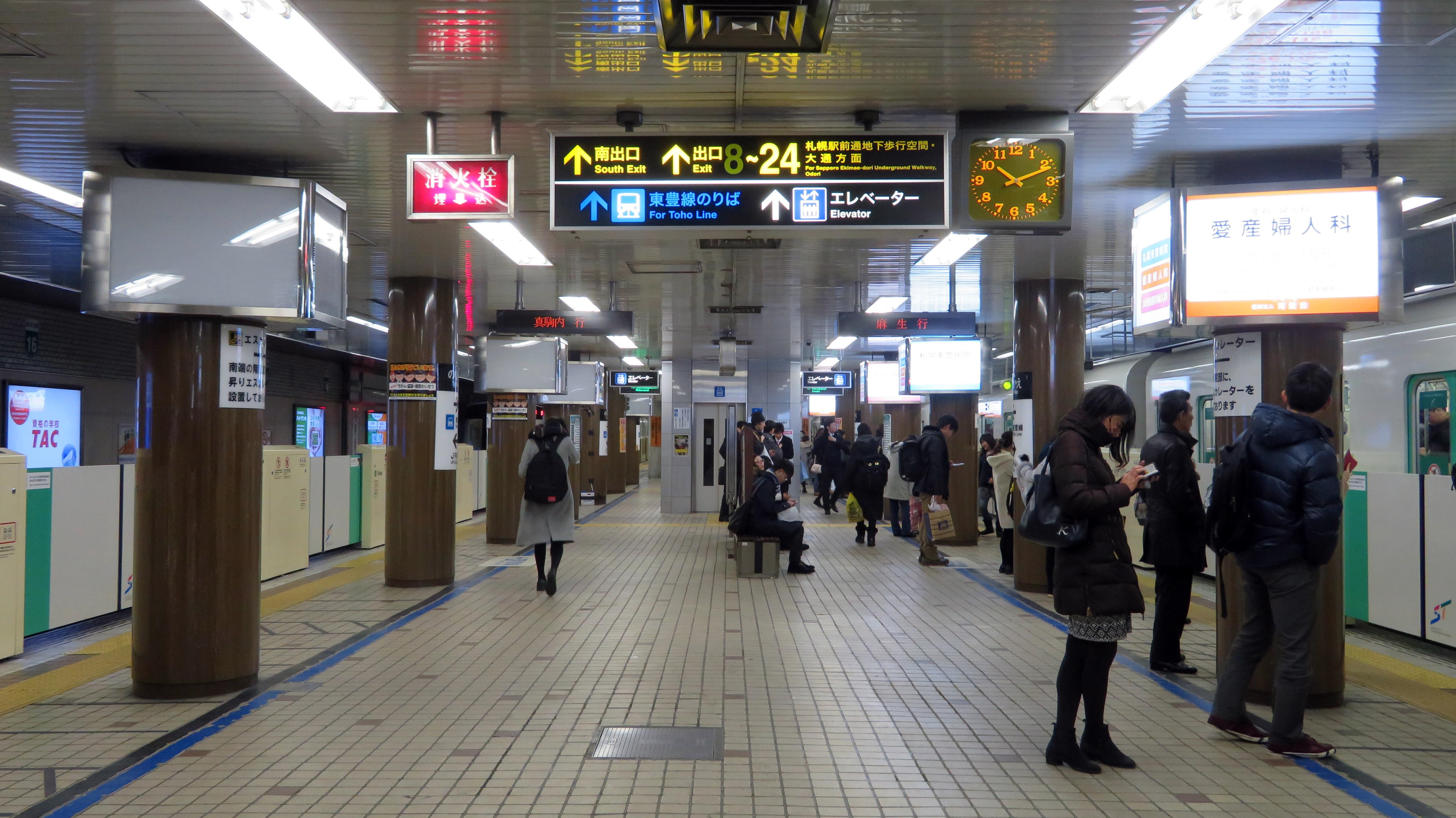
- Namboku Line platform

General information
- Location: Chūō-ku, Sapporo, Hokkaido; Japan
- System: Sapporo Municipal Subway station
- Operator: Sapporo City Transportation Bureau
- Lines: Namboku Line; Tōhō Line
- Connections: JR Hokkaido (Sapporo Station)

Construction
- Accessible: Yes

Other information
- Station code: N06 (Namboku Line), H07 (Tōhō Line)

History
- Opened: December 16, 1971; 54 years ago

Passengers
- FY2014: 84,633 daily

Services
Preceding station	Sapporo Municipal Subway	Following station
Kita-Jūni-Jō N05 towards Asabu	Namboku Line	Ōdōri N07 towards Makomanai
Kita-Jūsan-Jō-Higashi H06 towards Sakaemachi	Tōhō Line	Ōdōri H08 towards Fukuzumi
Location
- Location within Hokkaido Location within Japan

Sapporo Station (さっぽろ駅, Sapporo-eki) (Note: "Sapporo" is officially written in hiragana, rather than the typical kanji (札幌), to differentiate it from the adjacent but separate JR Hokkaido station.) is a Sapporo Municipal Subway station in Chūō-ku, Sapporo, Hokkaido, Japan. The station is numbered "N06" for the Namboku Line, and "H07" for the Tōhō Line. The station is connected to the JR Hokkaido Sapporo Station by an underground passage.

== Platforms ==
=== Namboku Line ===
1	■ Namboku Line	for Makomanai
2	■ Namboku Line	for Asabu

=== Tōhō Line ===
3(Toho Line track No.1)	■ Tōhō Line	for Fukuzumi
4(Toho Line track No.2)	■ Tōhō Line	for Sakaemachi

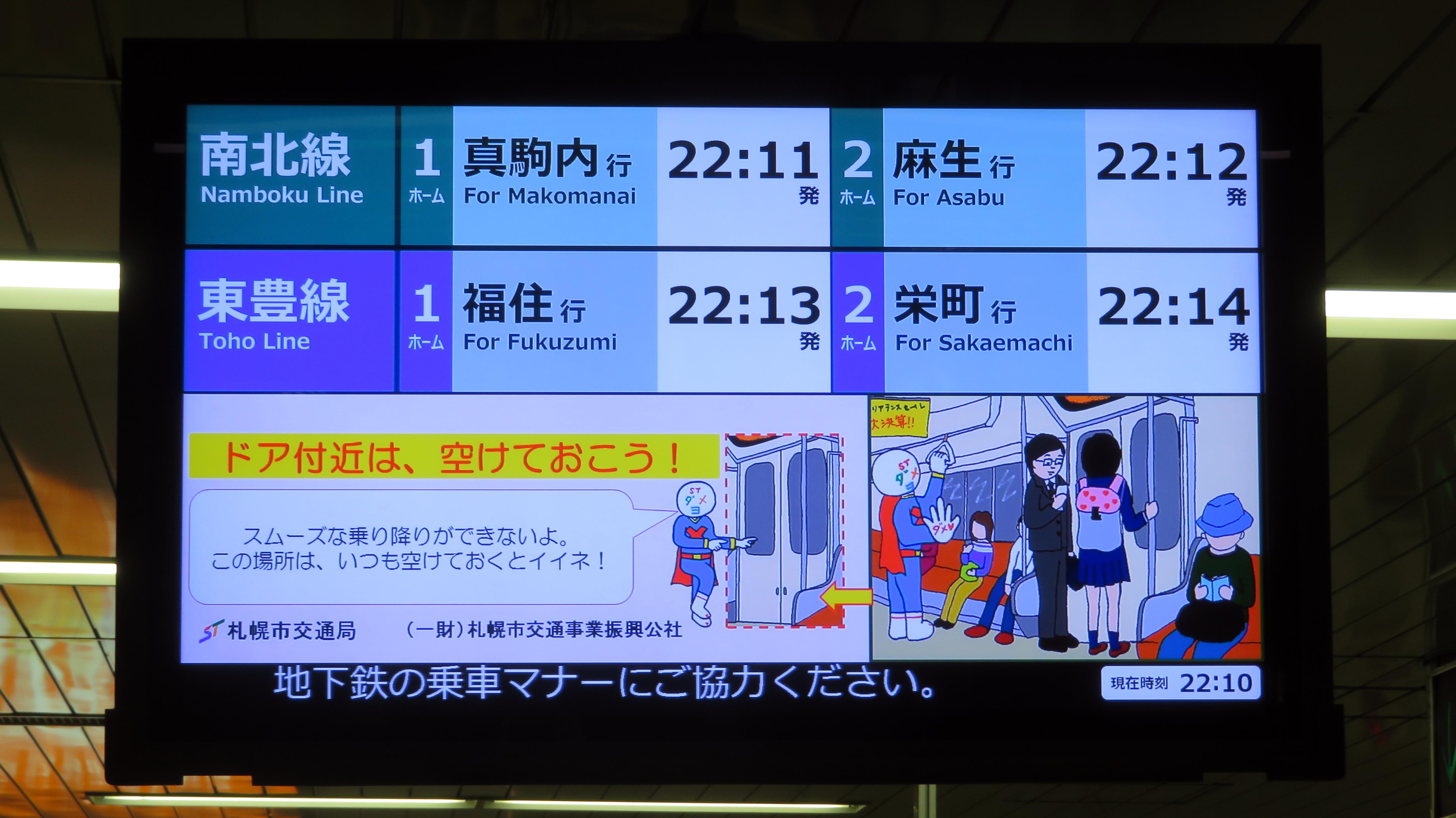
Train information display

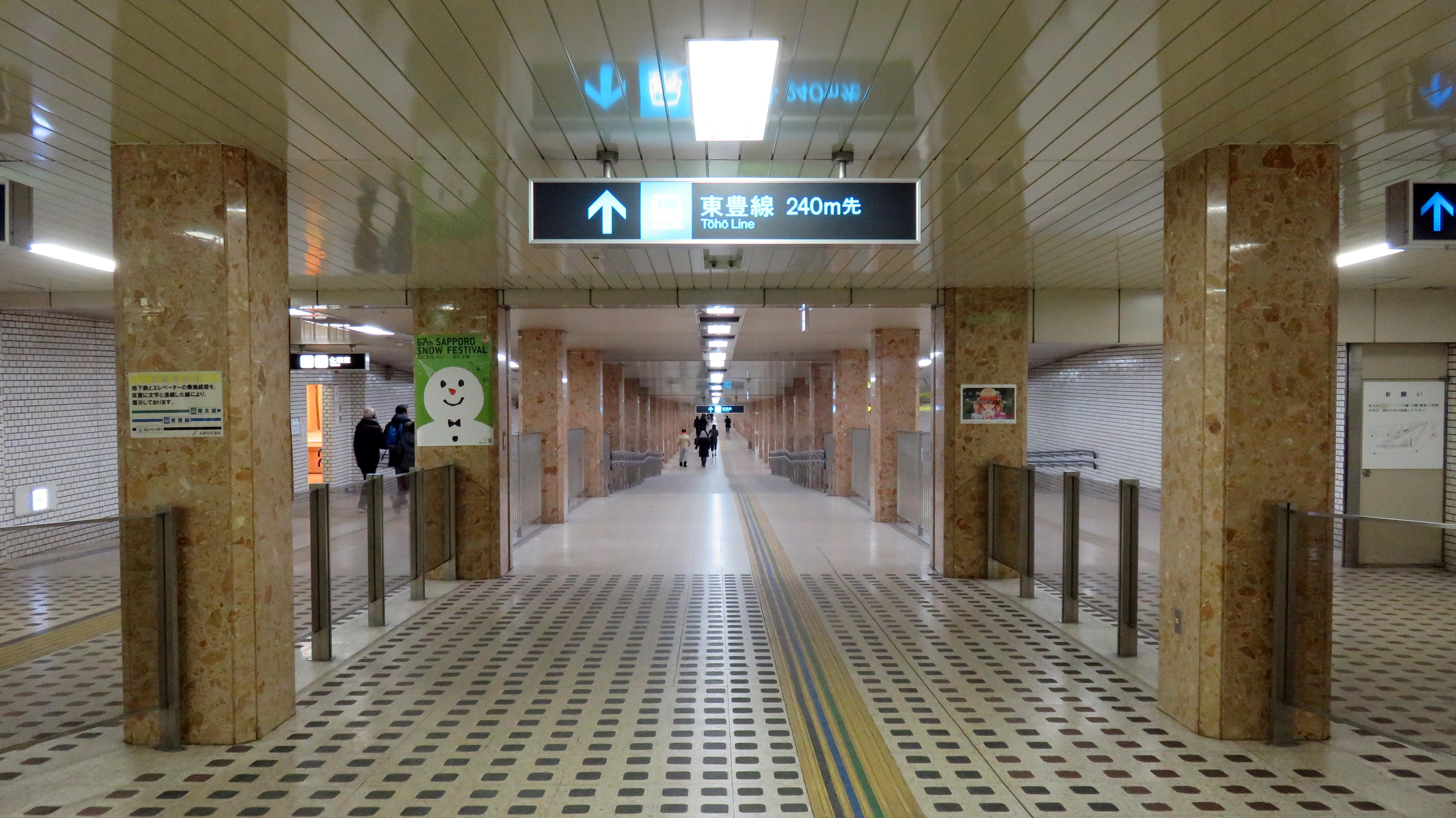
Passageway between Namboku Line and Toho Line platforms

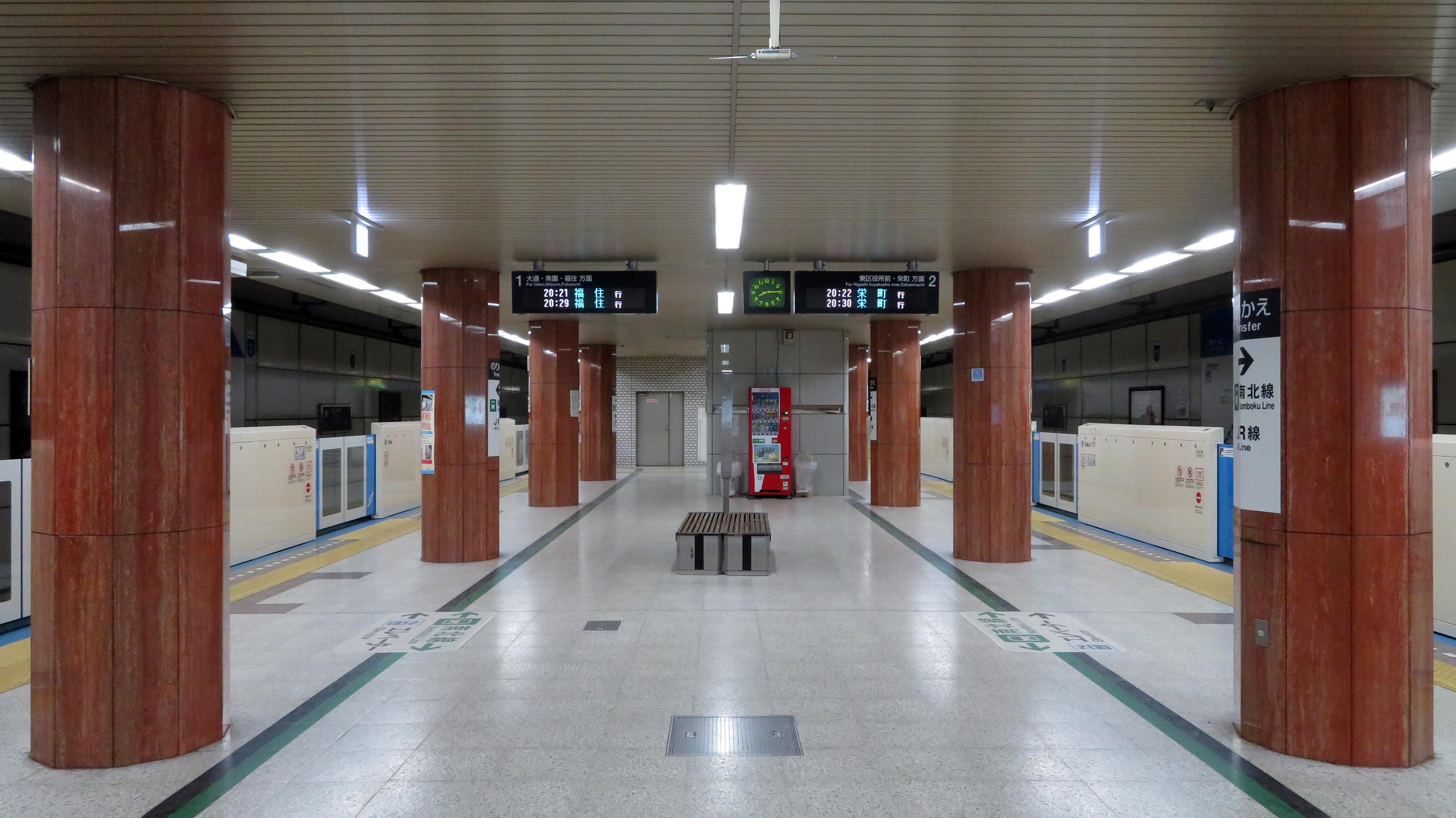
Toho Line platform

== History ==
The station opened on 16 December 1971 coinciding with the opening of the Namboku Line from Makomanai Station to Kita-Nijuyo-Jo Station.

The platforms for the Tōhō Line opened on 2 December 1988 coinciding with the line's opening.

== Surrounding area ==
- Sapporo Station (JR Hokkaido)
- Sapporo station Bus Terminal
- National Route 5, (to Hakodate)
- Hokkaido Development Bureau building
- Hokkaido University
- Hokkaido Police Headquarters
- Sapporo Central Post Office
- Sapporo 1 building, (Sapporo Government Office building)
- Sapporo agricultural cooperative association (JA Sapporo), Chuo branch
- Sapporo JR Tower
- Sapporo Stellar Place, shopping mall
- Daimaru store, Sapporo branch
- Sapporo Cinema Frontier
- Sapporo Esta, shopping center
- Tokyu Department store
- Asty 45 building
- Paseo shopping center
- Apia shopping center
- Loft Sapporo store
- Hotel New Otani Sapporo
- North Pacific Bank, Kitashichijo branch
- Hokkaido Bank Sapporo-eki branch
- Mizuho Bank, Sapporo branch
- Aozora Bank, Sapporo Branch
- Aomori Bank, Sapporo Branch
- Suruga Bank, Sapporo Branch
- Daishi Bank, Sapporo Branch
- Hidaka shinkin Bank, Sapporo Branch

== See also ==
- List of railway stations in Japan
