= Tsukisamu-Chūō Station =

Subway station in Sapporo, Japan

Coordinates: 43°1′50.034″N 141°23′46.280″E

H13 Tsukisamu-Chūō Station 月寒中央駅
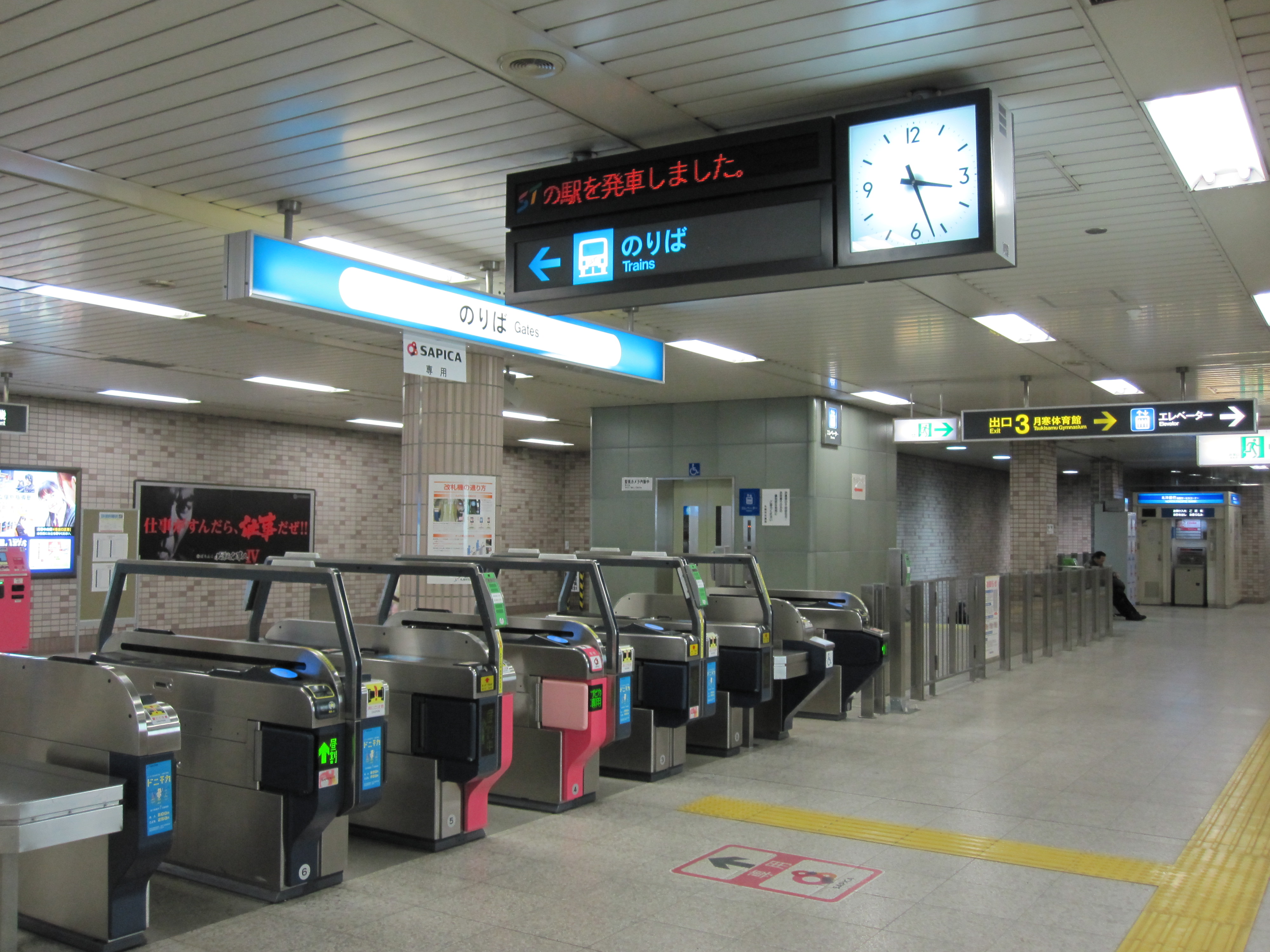
- Station gates

General information
- Location: Toyohira, Sapporo, Hokkaido; Japan
- System: Sapporo Municipal Subway station
- Operator: Sapporo City Transportation Bureau
- Line: Tōhō Line

Construction
- Accessible: Yes

Other information
- Station code: H13

History
- Opened: 14 October 1994; 31 years ago

Services
Preceding station	Sapporo Municipal Subway	Following station
Misono H12 towards Sakaemachi	Tōhō Line	Fukuzumi H14 Terminus
Location

Tsukisamu-Chūō Station (月寒中央駅) is a metro station in Toyohira-ku, Sapporo, Hokkaido, Japan. The station number is H13. It is located in the south of the Tōhō Line.

== Platforms ==
1	■ Tōhō Line	for Fukuzumi
2	■ Tōhō Line	for Sakaemachi

== History ==
The station opened on 14 October 1994 coinciding with the opening of the Toho Line extension from Hōsui-Susukino Station to Fukuzumi Station.

== Surrounding area ==
- Japan National Route 36 (to Muroran)
- Tsukisamu Gymnasium
