= Gakuen-Mae Station (Hokkaido) =

Subway station in Sapporo, Japan

Coordinates: 43°2′49.962″N 141°22′8.75″E

H10 Gakuen-Mae Station 学園前駅
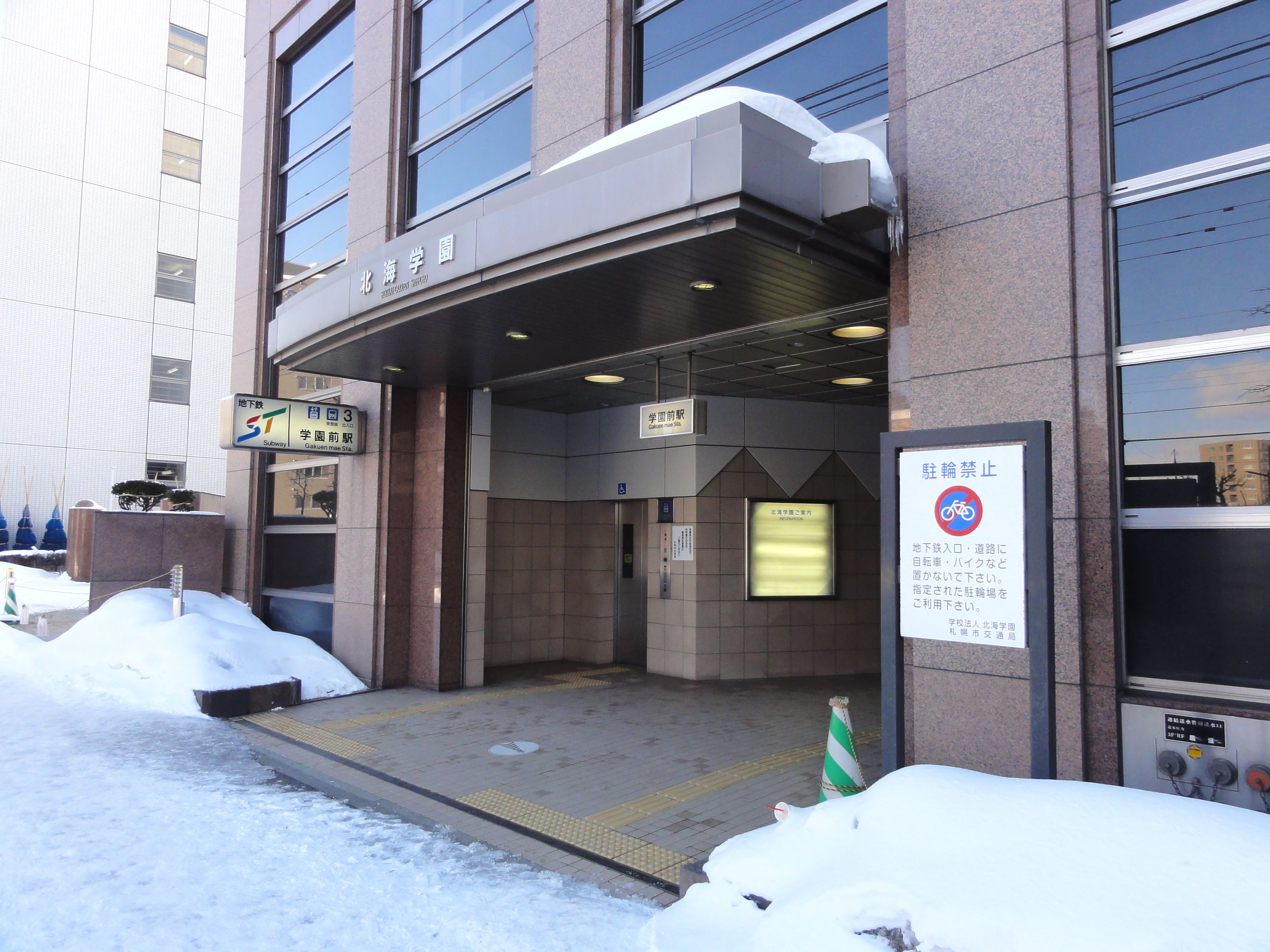
- Station exit 3

General information
- Location: Toyohira, Sapporo, Hokkaido; Japan
- System: Sapporo Municipal Subway station
- Operator: Sapporo City Transportation Bureau
- Line: Tōhō Line

Construction
- Accessible: Yes

Other information
- Station code: H10

History
- Opened: 14 October 1994; 31 years ago

Services
Preceding station	Sapporo Municipal Subway	Following station
Hōsui-Susukino H09 towards Sakaemachi	Tōhō Line	Toyohira-Kōen H11 towards Fukuzumi
Location

Gakuen-Mae Station (学園前駅, Gakuen-Mae-eki) is a subway station on the Sapporo Municipal Subway Tōhō Line in Toyohira-ku, Sapporo, Hokkaido, Japan. It is numbered "H10".

== Platforms ==
1	■ Tōhō Line	for Fukuzumi
2	■ Tōhō Line	for Sakaemachi

== History ==
The station opened on 14 October 1994 coinciding with the opening of the Toho Line extension from Hōsui-Susukino Station to Fukuzumi Station.

== Surrounding area ==
- National Route 453, (to Date)
- National Route 36, (to Muroran)
- Hokkai Gakuen University
- Hokkai School of Commerce
