= Shindō-Higashi Station =

Subway station in Sapporo, Japan

Coordinates: 43°6′16.471″N 141°22′8.815″E

H02 Shindō-Higashi Station 新道東駅
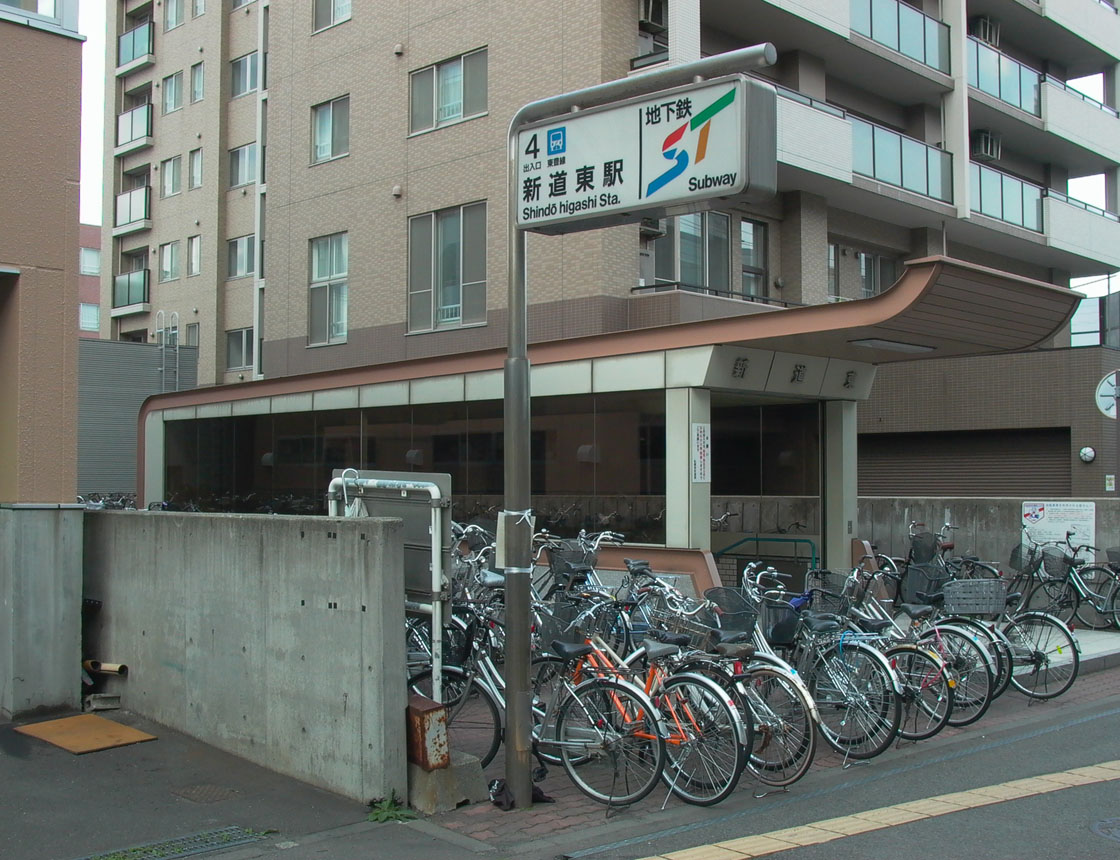
- Station exit 4

General information
- Location: Higashi, Sapporo, Hokkaido; Japan
- System: Sapporo Municipal Subway station
- Operator: Sapporo City Transportation Bureau
- Line: Tōhō Line

Construction
- Accessible: Yes

Other information
- Station code: H02

History
- Opened: 2 December 1988; 37 years ago

Services
Preceding station	Sapporo Municipal Subway	Following station
Sakaemachi H01 Terminus	Tōhō Line	Motomachi H03 towards Fukuzumi
Location

Shindō-Higashi Station (新道東駅) is a Sapporo Municipal Subway in Higashi-ku, Sapporo, Hokkaido, Japan. The station number is H02.

== Platforms ==
1	■ Tōhō Line	for Fukuzumi
2	■ Tōhō Line	for Sakaemachi

== History ==
The station opened on 2 December 1988 coinciding with the opening of the Toho Line from Sakaemachi Station to Hōsui-Susukino Station.

== Surrounding area ==
- Japan National Route 274 (to Shibecha)
