= Sapporo Dome =

Stadium in Hokkaido, Japan

Coordinates: 43°00′55″N 141°24′35″E

Sapporo Dome Daiwa House Premist Dome
- Hiroba

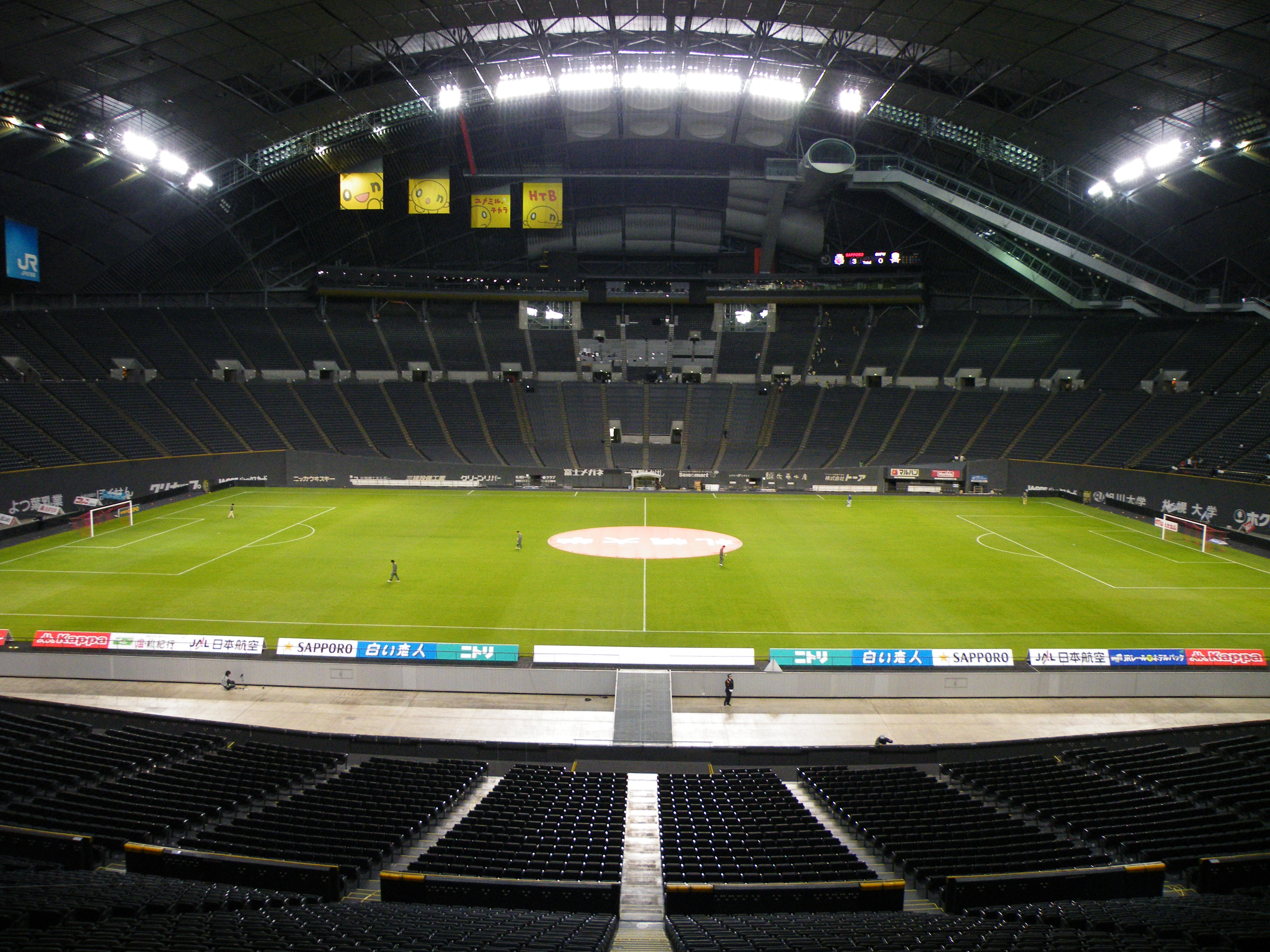
- Interactive map of Sapporo Dome; Daiwa House Premist Dome
- Location: Hitsujigaoka 1, Toyohira-ku, Sapporo, Hokkaido, Japan
- Owner: Sapporo City
- Capacity: 42,065 (football); 42,270 (baseball)
- Field size: Left Field – 100 m (328.1 ft); Center Field – 122 m (400.3 ft); Right Field – 100 m (328.1 ft); Backstop – 25 m (82 ft); Height of Outfield Fence – 5.75 m (18.9 ft)
- Public transit: Sapporo Municipal Subway: Tōhō Line at Fukuzumi

Construction
- Opened: June 3, 2001
- Architect: Hiroshi Hara

Tenants
- Hokkaido Consadole Sapporo (2001–present); Hokkaido Nippon-Ham Fighters (2004–2022); Major sporting events hosted; 2002 FIFA World Cup; 2019 Rugby World Cup; 2020 Summer Olympics football; Apex Legends Global Series Championship 2025, 2026, 2027; Pine Bowl 2001, 2003, 2005, 2007, 2011, 2016

The Sapporo Dome (札幌ドーム, Sapporo Dōmu), a.k.a. the Daiwa House Premist Dome (大和ハウス プレミストドーム, Daiwa Hausu Puremisuto Dōmu) for sponsorship reasons, is a stadium located in Sapporo, Hokkaido, Japan, and is primarily used for association football. It is the home field of the association football club Hokkaido Consadole Sapporo, and was also home to the baseball team Hokkaido Nippon-Ham Fighters through the 2022 Nippon Professional Baseball season. It was a football venue for the 2020 Summer Olympics, was the venue for the opening ceremony of the 2017 Asian Winter Games, and was used for two matches of the 2019 Rugby World Cup. The stadium also hosted matches during the 2002 FIFA World Cup and serves as the venue for the Apex Legends Global Series (ALGS) Championship, having done so since 2025.

On 19 July 2024, it was announced that the stadium would be named Daiwa House Premist Dome from 1 August 2024 to 31 July 2028, due to a four-year naming rights contract with Daiwa House, a homebuilding company.

== History ==
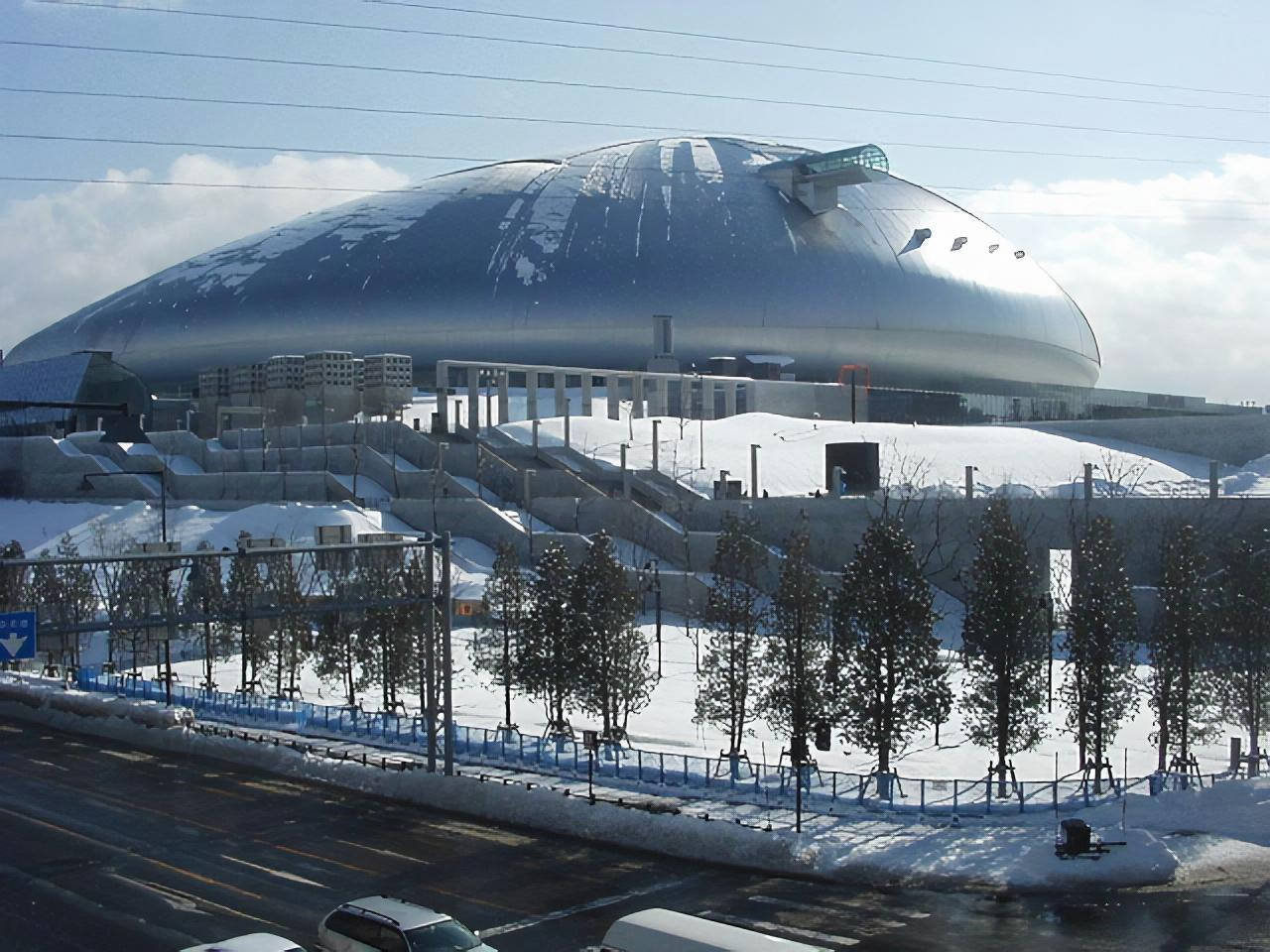
Sapporo Dome in Winter

Sapporo Dome opened in 2001 with 41,580 seats. The stadium hosted three games during the 2002 FIFA World Cup, Germany vs Saudi Arabia, Argentina vs England and Italy vs Ecuador; all three matches were in the first round.

The Dome hosted the opening ceremonies of the 2007 FIS Nordic World Ski Championships on February 22 and hosted the closing ceremonies of the championships on March 4. It also made history as being the first venue where both indoor and nighttime skiing events took place for the first time on a world championship or Winter Olympic Games level with competitions in the cross-country skiing sprints (men's and women's individual, and men's and women's team) and the cross-country portion of the 7.5 km sprint event in the Nordic combined. In order to generate snow, the stadium used its turf conversion hovering system to facilitate the snow making process for the skiing competitions. The opening ceremony featured Maki Ohguro, a local artist from Sapporo, Japanese drum demonstrations and other performances paying tributes to local customs and traditions. For the championships, seating capacity was reduced to 30,000.

The Dome was used as a super special stage in Rally Japan in both 2008 and 2010.

In late 2009, renovations with the possibility of increasing the capacity up to 53,796 were finished. These renovations also included space for more food outlets, an extra video screen, two extra changing rooms (to accommodate preseason matches in the NFL International Series, which have up to 75 players per team) and further media area as part of new office buildings attached to the stadium. As part of these renovations, the surface area of the arena itself was decreased to allow for more seating.

Beginning in 2023, the dome's surface became soccer-only, as the Fighters moved into their own new stadium in nearby Kitahiroshima.

== Retractable surface ==
The Dome switches between two entirely different surfaces: Baseball games are played on an underlying artificial turf field, while association football games are held on a grass pitch that slides into and out of the stadium as needed.

Conversion from baseball to football begins with the storage of the baseball field's artificial turf. Once finished, a set of lower bowl bleachers rotate from an angled position for baseball to a parallel position. A set of main bowl seats on one end of the dome then retracts, and the football pitch is slid into the stadium. The lower bowl is then rotated 90 degrees. Conversion from football to baseball occurs in reverse. Due to the retraction of seats, the Stadium has a capacity of 40,476 for baseball games.

Other stadiums that feature sliding pitches include the GelreDome in the Netherlands, Veltins-Arena in Germany, State Farm Stadium in Glendale, Arizona, United States, and Allegiant Stadium in Paradise, Nevada, United States, along with the split pitch of London's Tottenham Hotspur Stadium and Madrid's Santiago Bernabéu Stadium; however, unlike these facilities (with the exception of Allegiant Stadium), the Sapporo Dome has a fixed roof.

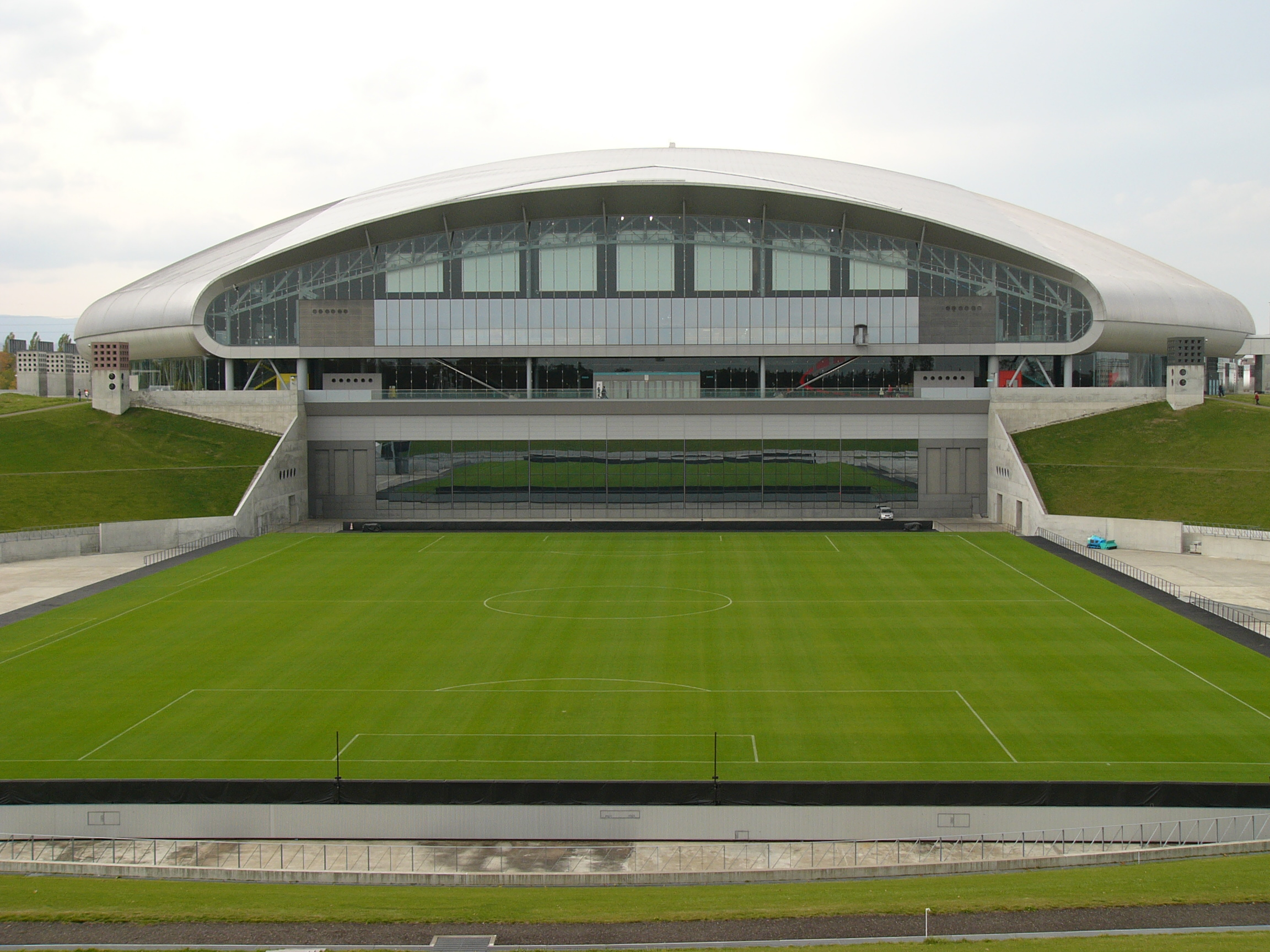
Retractable grass field shown outside the stadium

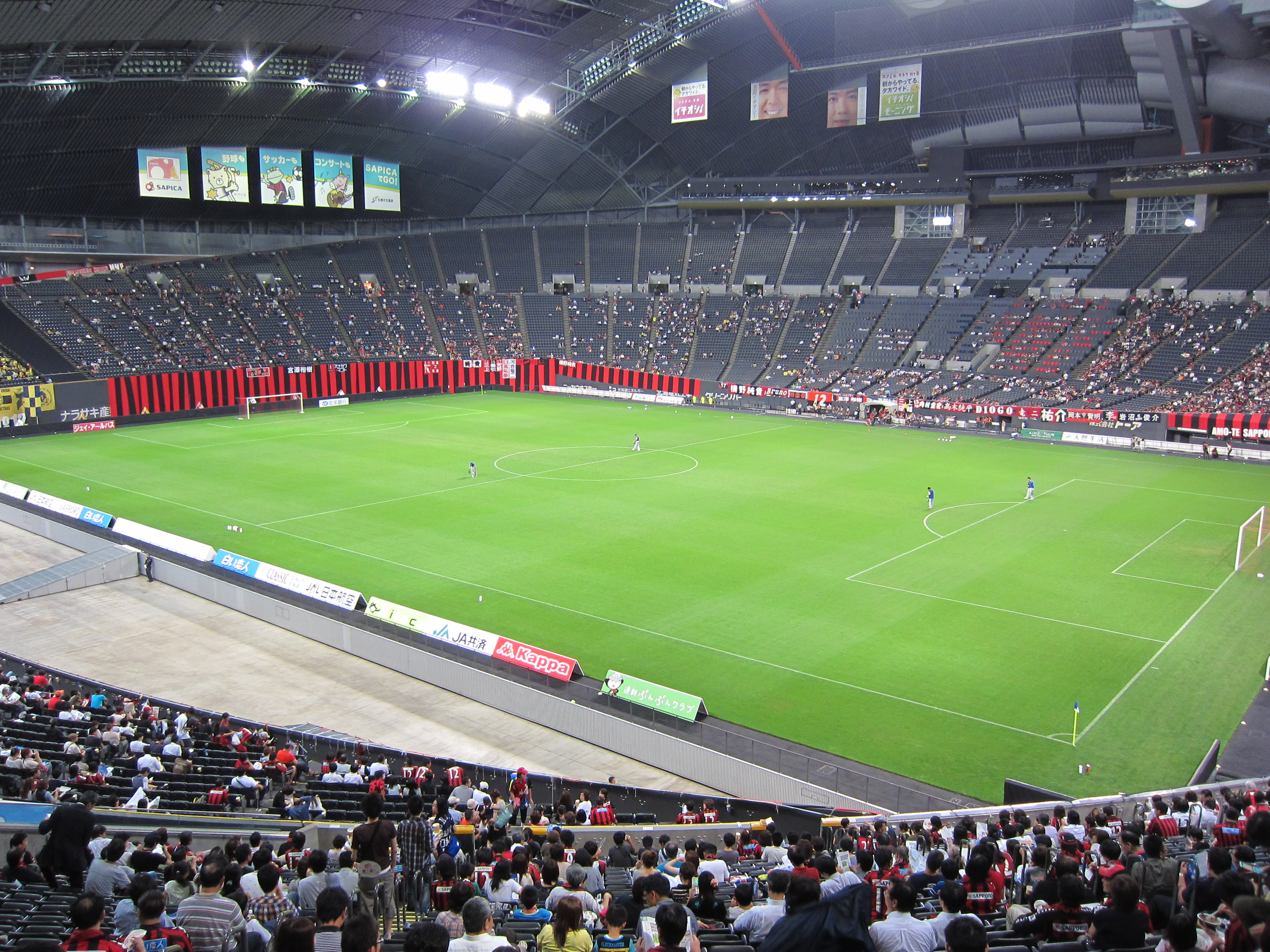
Football field installed inside the stadium, during a football match.

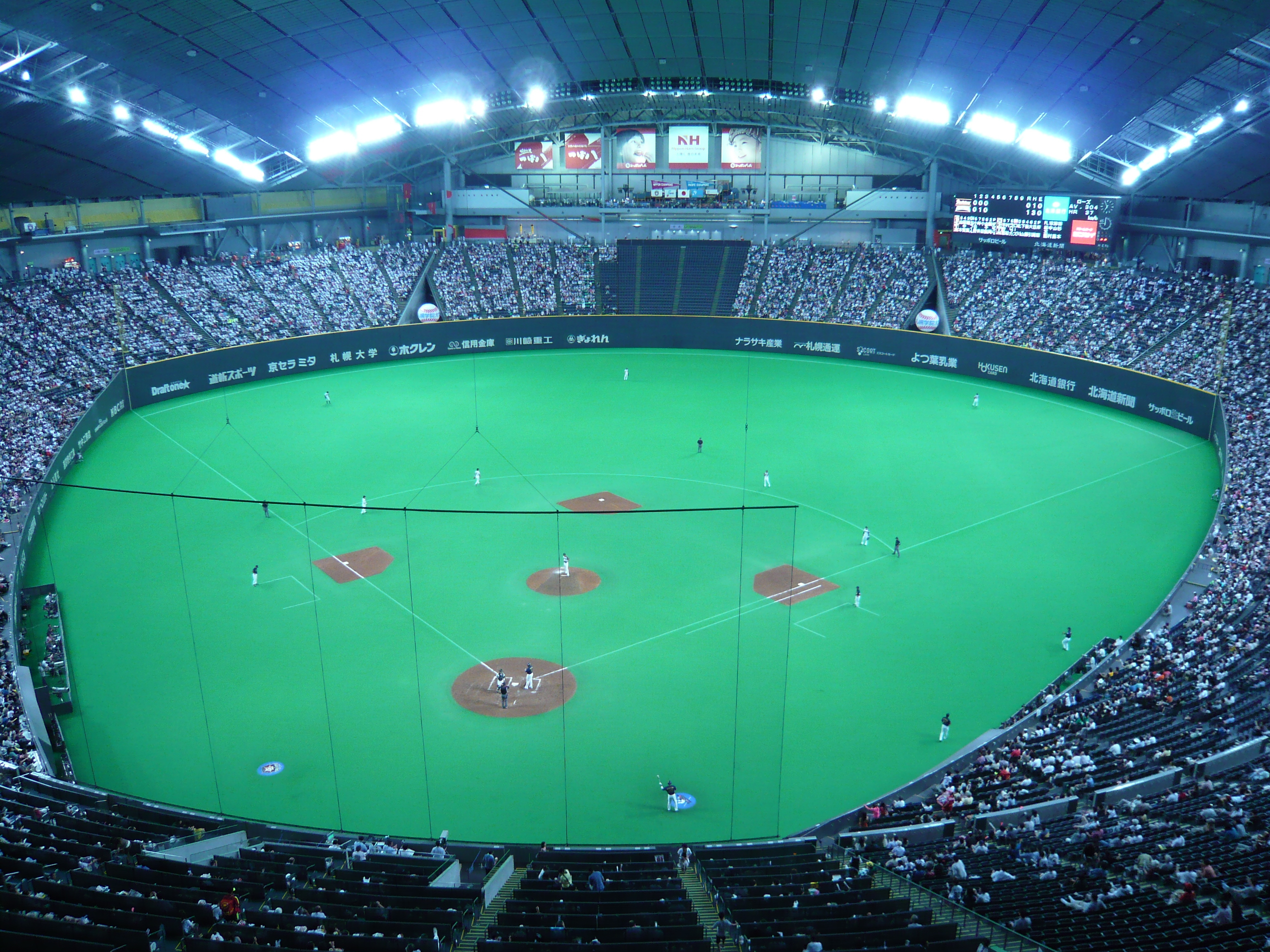
Inside the stadium during a baseball game.

== Details ==
- Name: Sapporo Dome
- Capacity: 42,065 / 40,476
- Home team: Hokkaido Consadole Sapporo
- Former home team: Hokkaido Nippon-Ham Fighters (2004–2022)
- Completed: March 2001
- Location: Sapporo City, Hokkaido, Japan
- Building area: 53,800 m^{2}
- Total floor area: 92,453 m^{2} (open arena)
- Roof diameter: 245 meters
- Stand inclination: Max. 30° angle
- Winter heating: Gas
- Architect: Hiroshi Hara

== Access ==
- Tōhō Line: 10 minutes walk from Fukuzumi Station.

== Major sports matches ==
=== 2002 FIFA World Cup ===
Date	Team 1	Result	Team 2	Round (A, B, C, D...)	Attendance
1 June 2002	Germany	8–0	Saudi Arabia	Group E	32,218
3 June 2002	Italy	2–0	Ecuador	Group G	31,081
7 June 2002	Argentina	0–1	England	Group F	35,927

=== 2019 Rugby World Cup ===
Date	Time (JST)	Team #1	Result	Team #2	Round	Attendance
21 September 2019	13:45	Australia	39–21	Fiji	Pool D	36,482
22 September 2019	19:15	England	35–3	Tonga	Pool C	35,923

=== Football at the 2020 Olympic Games ===
Men's Tournament
Date	Time (JST)	Team 1	Result	Team 2	Round	Attendance
22 July 2021	16.30	Egypt	0–0	Spain	Group C	0
22 July 2021	19.30	Argentina	0–2	Australia	Group C	0
25 July 2021	16.30	Egypt	0–1	Argentina	Group C	0
25 July 2021	19.00	Australia	0–1	Spain	Group C	0

Women's Tournament
Date	Time (JST)	Team 1	Result	Team 2	Round	Attendance
21 July 2021	16.30	Great Britain	2–0	Chile	Group E	0
21 July 2021	19.30	Japan	1–1	Australia	Group E	0
24 July 2021	16.30	Chile	0–1	Canada	Group E	0
24 July 2021	19.00	Japan	0–1	Great Britain	Group E	0

== See also ==
Other domed stadiums in Japan:

- Fukuoka Yahoo! Japan Dome in Fukuoka (retractable roof)
- Nagoya Dome in Nagoya
- Kyocera Dome Osaka in Osaka
- Ōita Stadium or "Big Eye" in Oita Prefecture (retractable roof)
- Tokyo Dome in Tokyo

Events and tenants
Preceded by Astana Arena (Kazakhstan) Astana/Almaty	Asian Winter Games; Opening Ceremonies; 2017	Succeeded by TBA
