= Sapporo Municipal Subway 9000 series =

Japanese train type

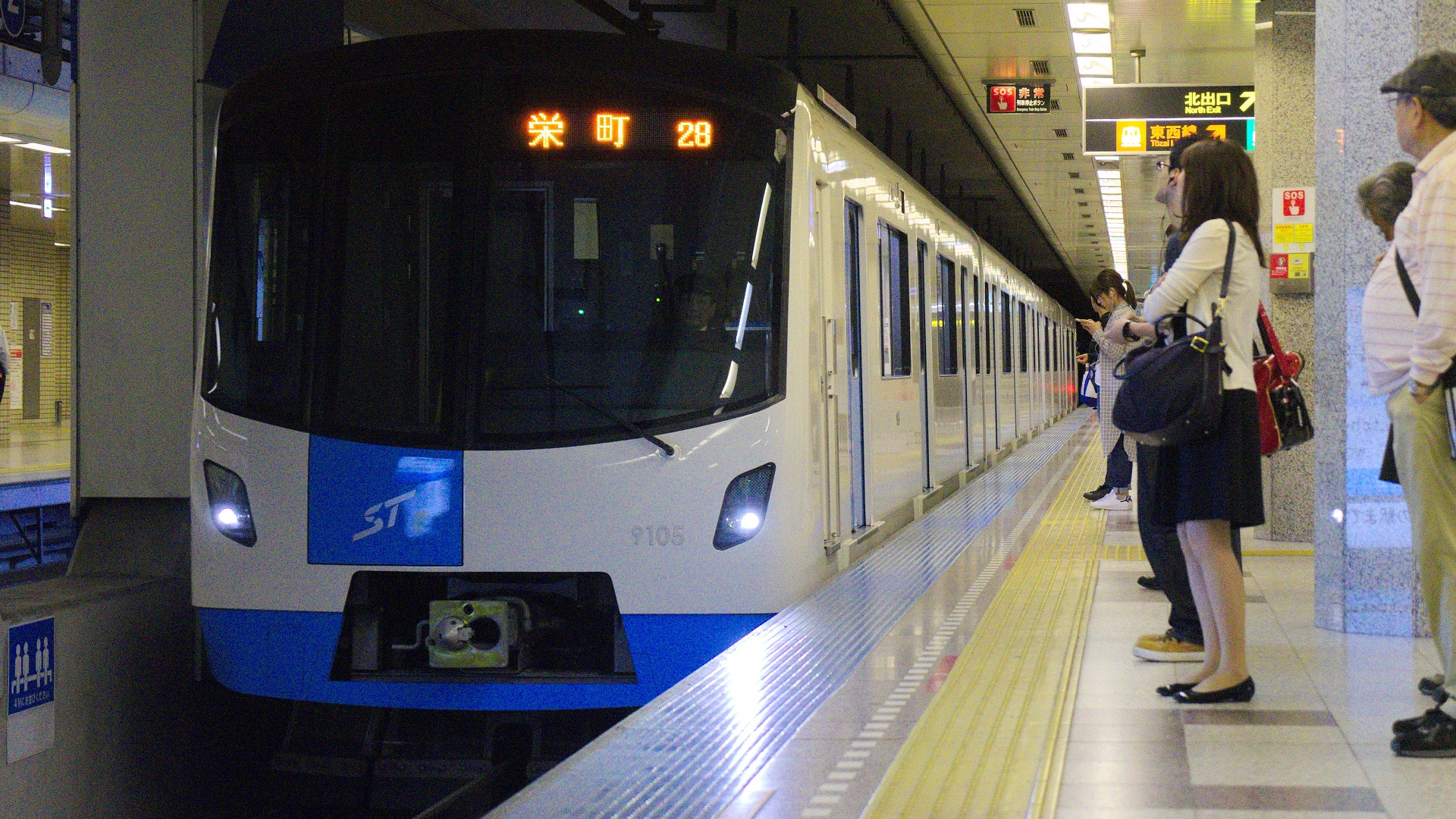
- Set 9105 at Ōdōri in September 2016

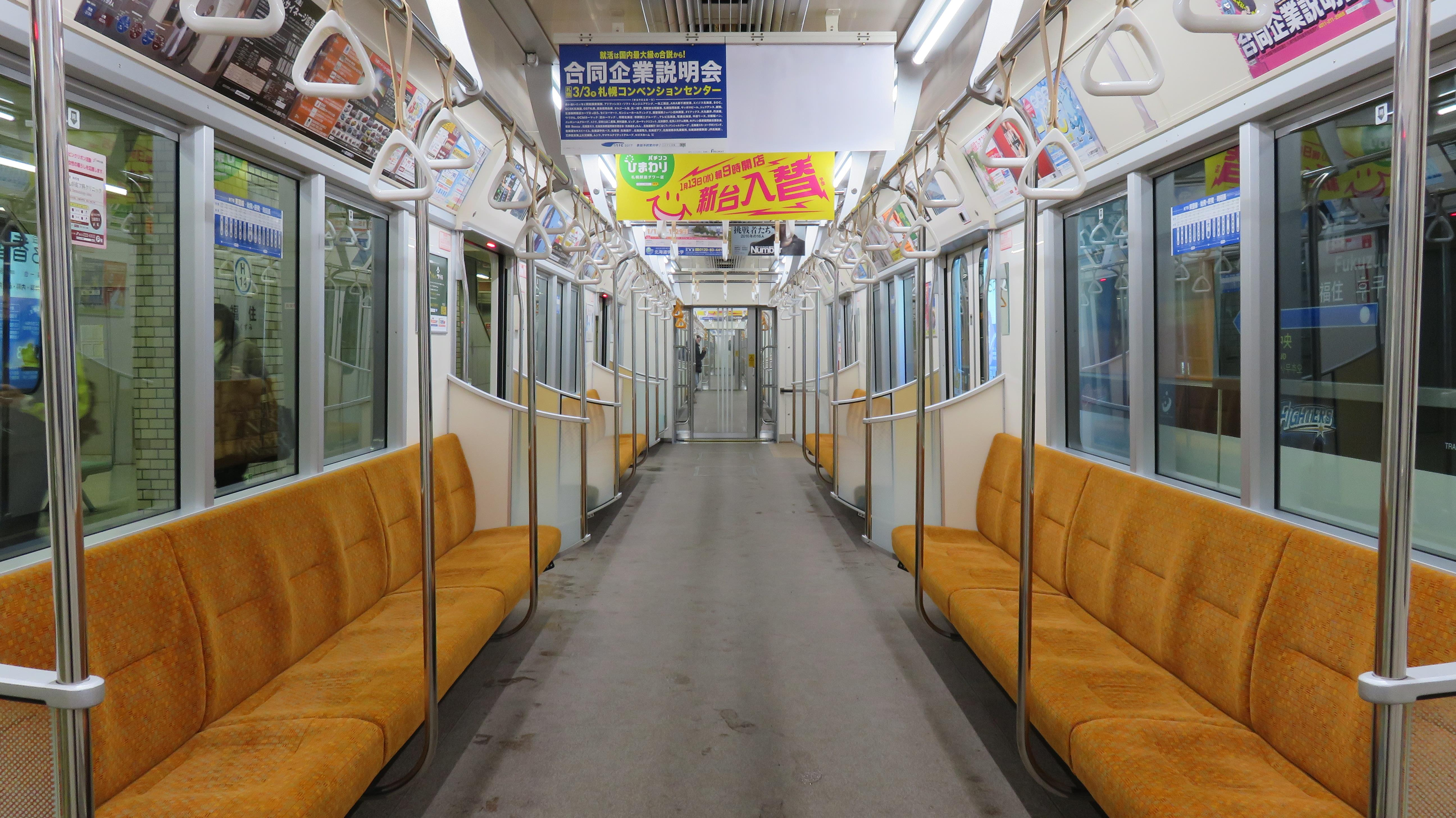
- Interior (January 2016)
- In service: 2015–present
- Manufacturer: Kawasaki Heavy Industries
- Built at: Kobe
- Replaced: 7000 series
- Constructed: 2014–2016
- Entered service: 8 May 2015
- Number built: 80 vehicles (20 sets)
- Number in service: 80 vehicles (20 sets)
- Formation: 4 cars per trainset
- Fleet numbers: 9101–9120
- Operator: Sapporo Municipal Subway
- Line served: Tōhō Line

Specifications
- Car body construction: Aluminium
- Train length: 69,250 mm (227 ft 2 in)
- Car length: 17,425 mm (57 ft 2 in) (end cars); 17,200 mm (56 ft 5 in) (intermediate cars)
- Width: 3,080 mm (10 ft 1 in)
- Height: 3,910 mm (12 ft 10 in)
- Floor height: 1,300 mm (4 ft 3 in)
- Doors: 3 pairs per side
- Maximum speed: 70 km/h (43 mph)
- Traction system: IGBT–VVVF
- Traction motors: 3-phase AC induction motor
- Acceleration: 3.5 km/(h⋅s) (2.2 mph/s)
- Deceleration: 4.0 km/(h⋅s) (2.5 mph/s) (service); 4.8 km/(h⋅s) (3.0 mph/s) (emergency)
- Electric systems: 1,500 V DC overhead catenary
- Current collection: Pantograph
- UIC classification: 2'2'+Bo'Bo'+Bo'Bo'+2'2'
- Safety systems: ATC and ATO
- Track gauge: Central guideway with rubber tires

The Sapporo Municipal Subway 9000 series (札幌市交通局 9000形) is a DC electric multiple unit (EMU) rubber-tyred metro train type operated by Sapporo Municipal Subway on the Tōhō Line in the city of Sapporo, Japan, since 8 May 2015.

== Design ==
The trains are built by Kawasaki Heavy Industries in Kobe and have aluminium bodies.

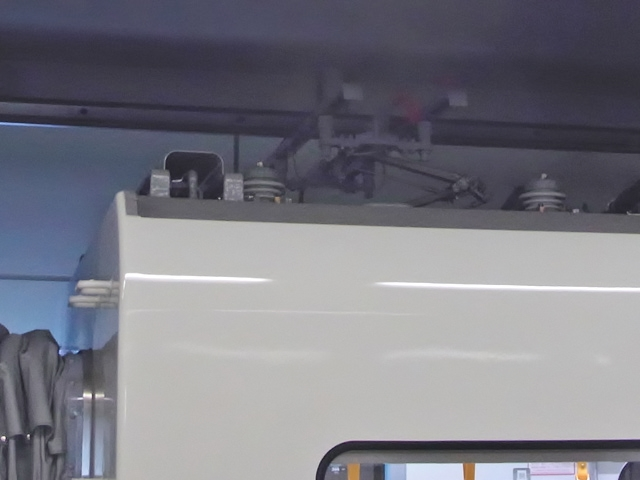
A single-arm pantograph on car 9201, May 2015

== Formations ==
The 9000 series trains are formed as four-car sets as shown below, consisting of two motored intermediate cars and two non-powered driving trailer cars. The Tc1 car is at the Sakaemachi end.

Car No.	1	2	3	4
Designation	Tc1	M1	M2	Tc2
Numbering	9100	9200	9300	9800
Weight (t)	25.1	27.8	27.7	25.3
Capacity (total/seated)	121/40	137/48	137/48	121/40

The two intermediate motor cars each have one single-arm pantograph.

== Interior ==
Passenger accommodation consists of longitudinal bench seating, with a wheelchair space in each car.

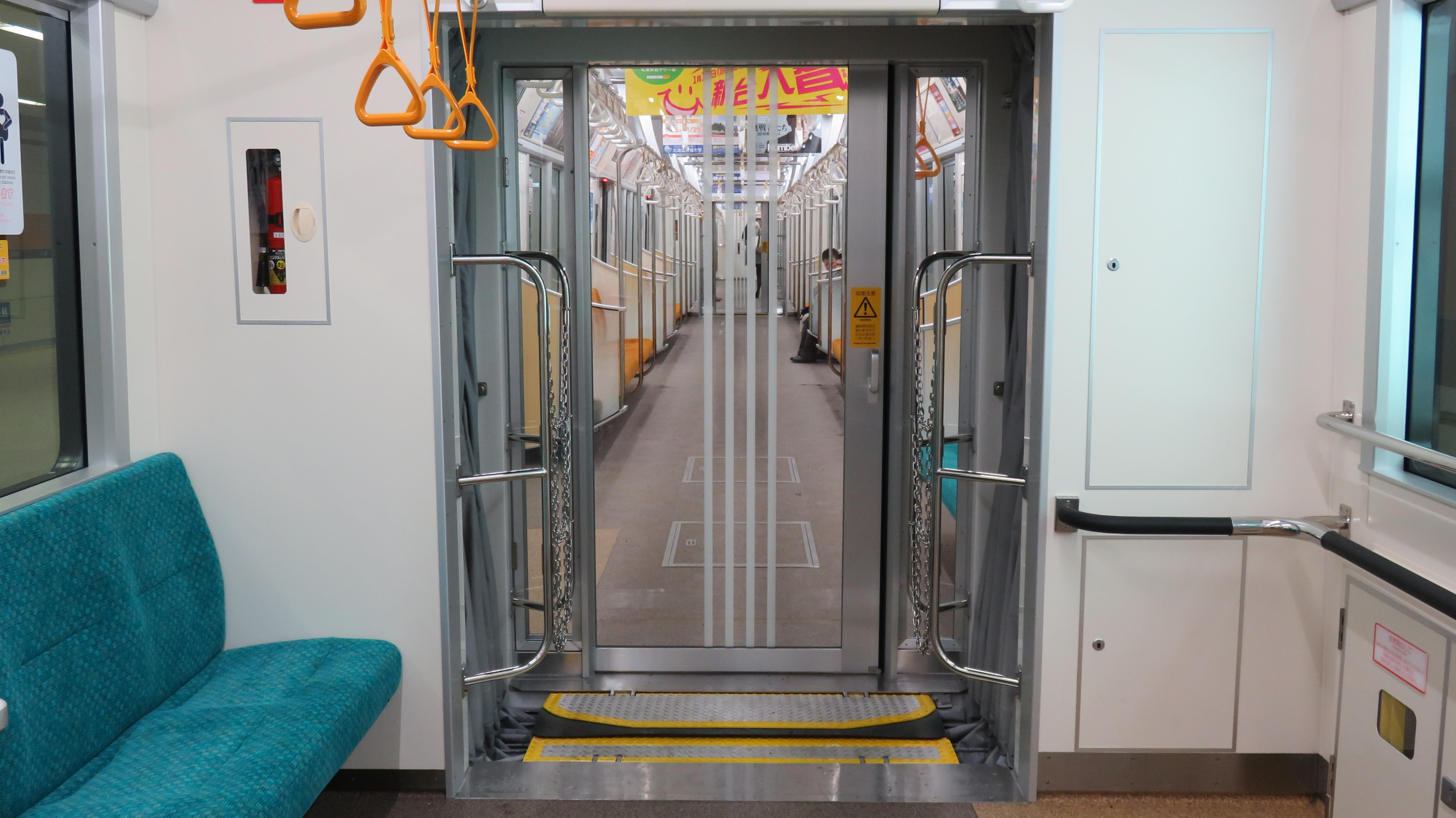
Priority seating and wheelchair space at the end of a car in January 2016

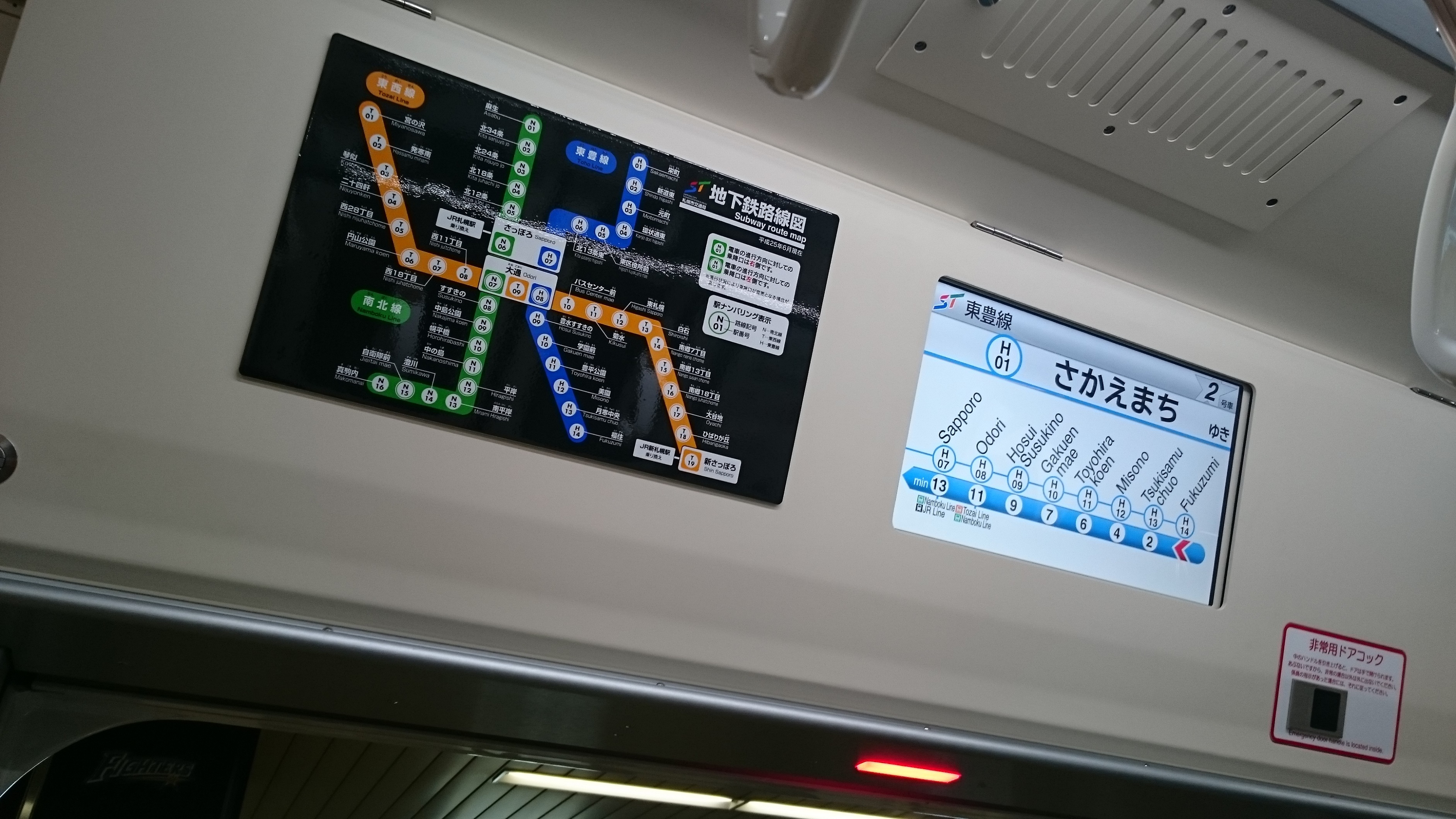
LCD passenger information displays above the doorways, May 2015

== History ==
The order for the fleet of new trains was placed with Kawasaki Heavy Industries in April 2013 at a cost of approximately 12 billion yen (excluding bogies and other equipment ordered separately), and the first trainset was unveiled to the media in November 2014. It entered revenue service on 8 May 2015.
