= Ōdōri Station =

Subway station in Sapporo, Japan

Coordinates: 43°3′37″N 141°21′8″E

N07 T09 H08 Ōdōri Station 大通駅
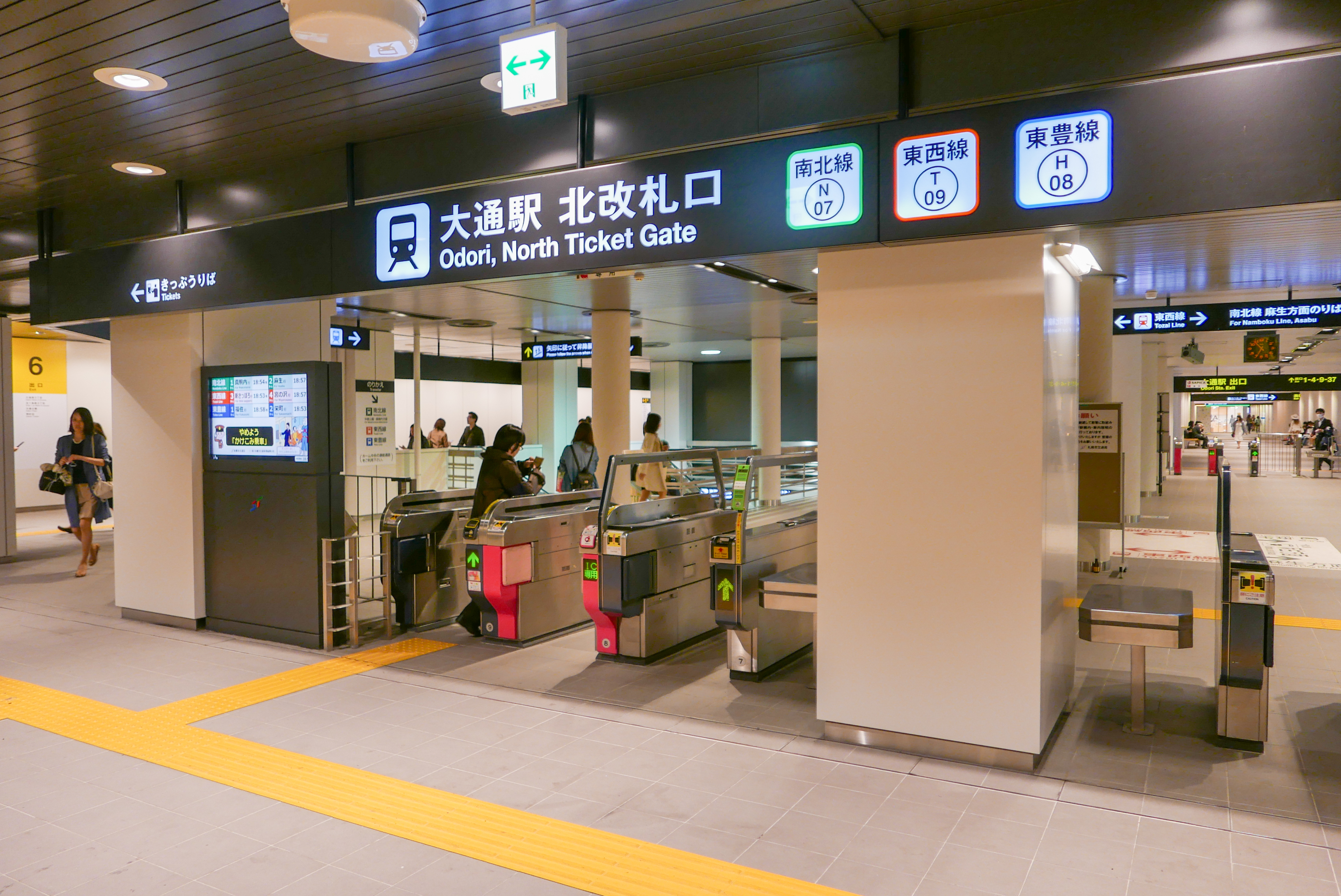
- The underground Northern ticket gates in April 2015

General information
- Location: Chūō-ku, Sapporo, Hokkaido; Japan
- System: Sapporo Municipal Subway station
- Operator: Sapporo City Transportation Bureau
- Lines: Namboku Line; Tōzai Line; Tōhō Line
- Platforms: 2 side platforms (Namboku Line); 1 island platform (Tōzai Line); 2 side platforms (Tōhō Line)
- Tracks: 6

Construction
- Accessible: Yes

Other information
- Station code: N07 (Namboku Line); T09 (Tōzai Line); H08 (Tōhō Line)

History
- Opened: 16 December 1971; 54 years ago

Passengers
- FY2014 (Daily): 75,259

Services
Preceding station	Sapporo Municipal Subway	Following station
Sapporo N06 towards Asabu	Namboku Line	Susukino N08 towards Makomanai
Nishi-Jūitchōme T08 towards Miyanosawa	Tōzai Line	Bus Center-Mae T10 towards Shin-Sapporo
Sapporo H07 towards Sakaemachi	Tōhō Line	Hōsui-Susukino H09 towards Fukuzumi
Location
- Location within Hokkaido Location within Japan

Ōdōri Station (大通駅, Ōdōri Eki) is a subway station in Chūō-ku, Sapporo, Hokkaido, Japan, operated by Sapporo Municipal Subway. The station opened on 16 December 1971 as part of the first phase of the Namboku Line.

== Lines ==
Odori Station is served by all lines of the Sapporo Municipal Subway.

== Platforms ==
=== Station layout ===
G	Street Level	Exit/Entrance
B1F	Upper mezzanine	Namboku Line/Tōzai Line ticket barriers, ticket machines
B2F; Namboku Line platforms	Side platform, doors will open on the left
B2F; Namboku Line platforms	Platform 2	→ Namboku Line for Asabu (Sapporo) →
B2F; Namboku Line platforms	Platform 1	← Namboku Line for Makomanai (Susukino)
B2F; Namboku Line platforms	Side platform, doors will open on the left
B2F; Namboku Line platforms	Transfer mezzanine	Transfer between Namboku/Tōzai Line platforms and Tōhō Line platforms Tōhō Line ticket barriers, ticket machines
B3F; Tōzai Line platforms	Platform 3	→ Tōzai Line for Shin-Sapporo (Bus Center-Mae) →
B3F; Tōzai Line platforms	Island platform, doors will open on the right
B3F; Tōzai Line platforms	Platform 4	← Tōzai Line for Miyanosawa (Nishi-Jūitchōme)
B3F; Tōzai Line platforms	Lower mezzanine	Tōhō Line ticket barriers, ticket machines
B4F; Tōhō Line platforms	Side platform, doors will open on the left
B4F; Tōhō Line platforms	Platform 6	→ Tōhō Line for Sakaemachi (Sapporo) →
B4F; Tōhō Line platforms	Platform 5	← Tōhō Line for Fukuzumi (Hōsui-Susukino)
B4F; Tōhō Line platforms	Side platform, doors will open on the left

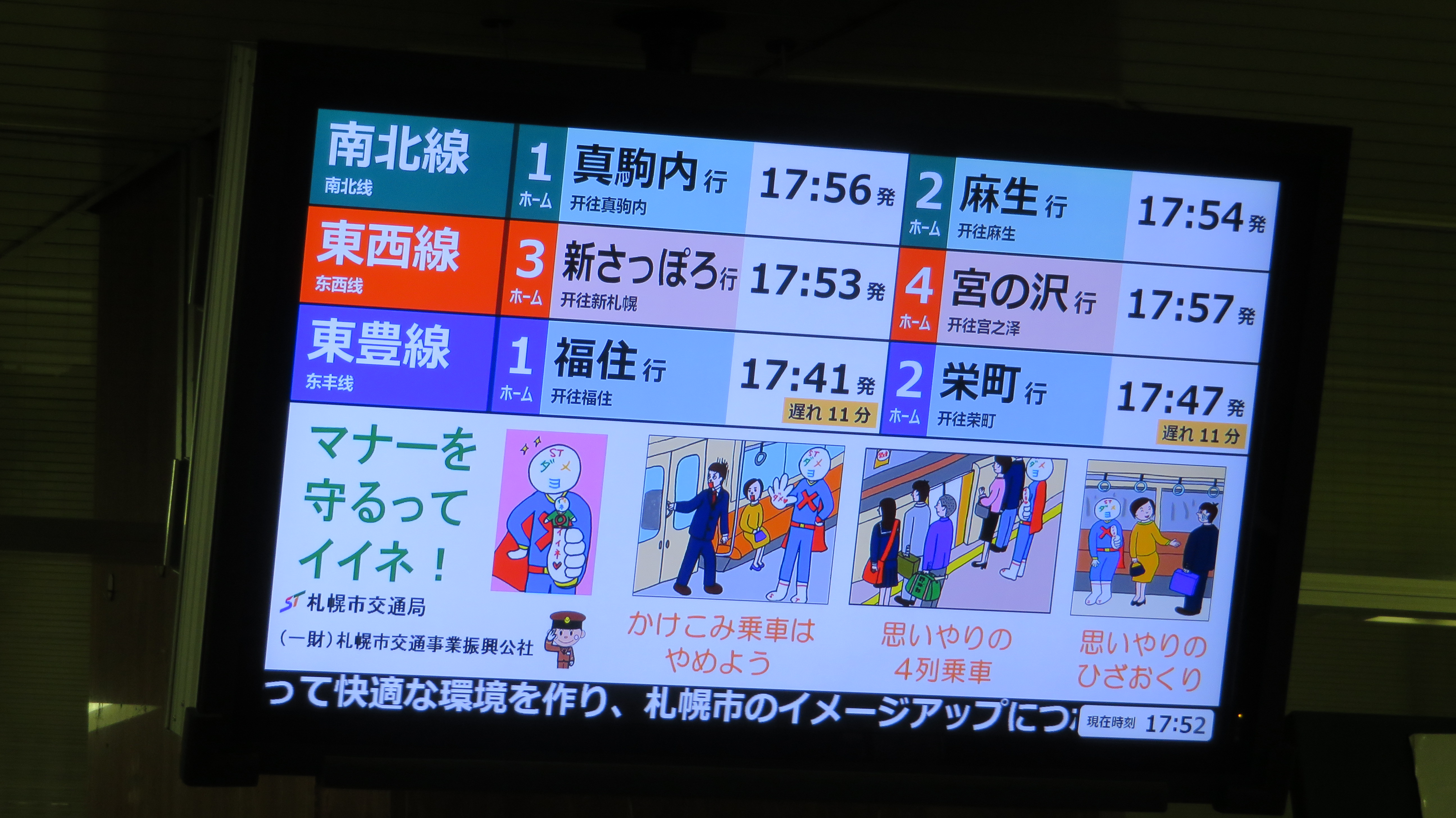
Train information board

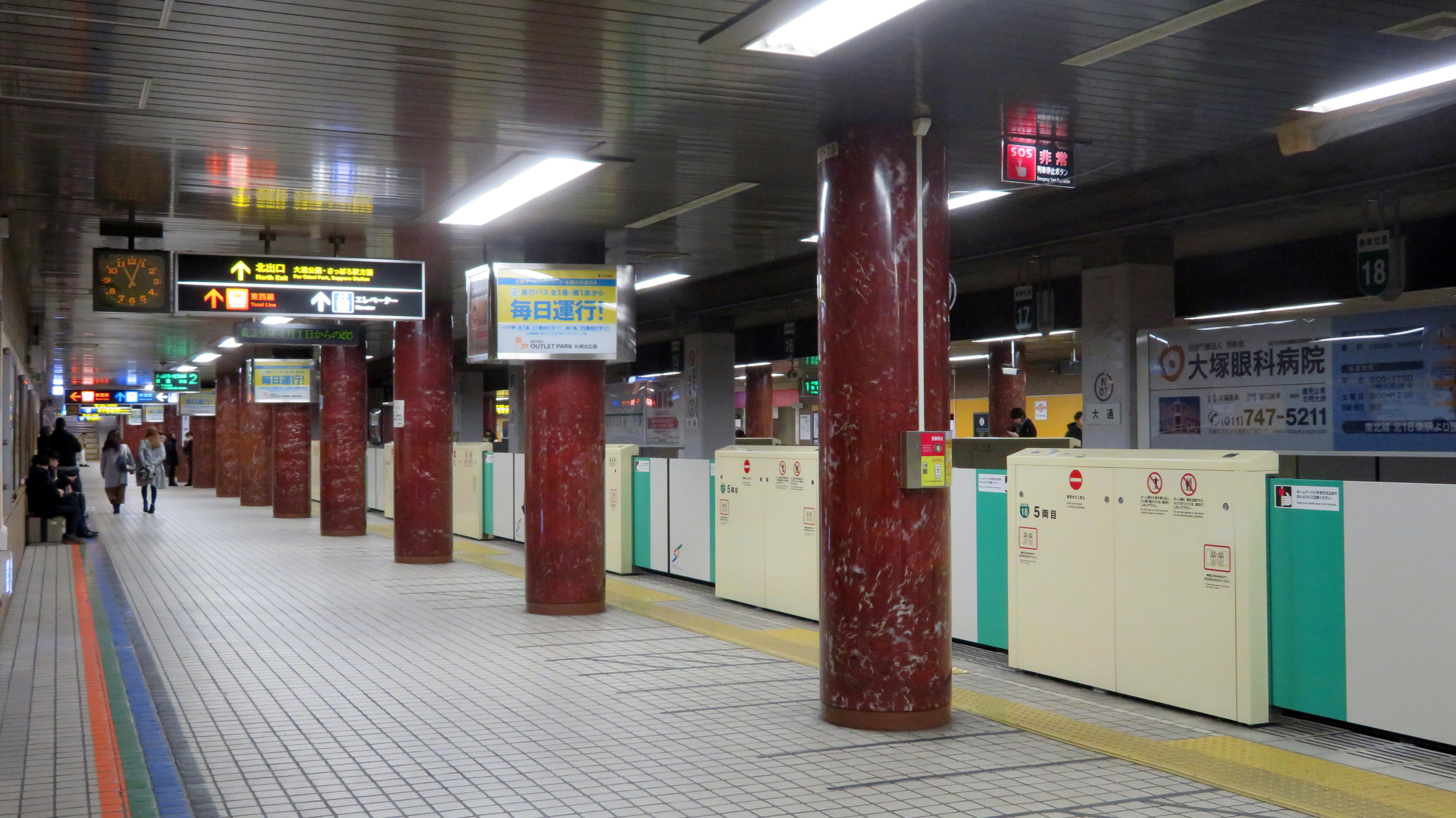
Namboku Line platform

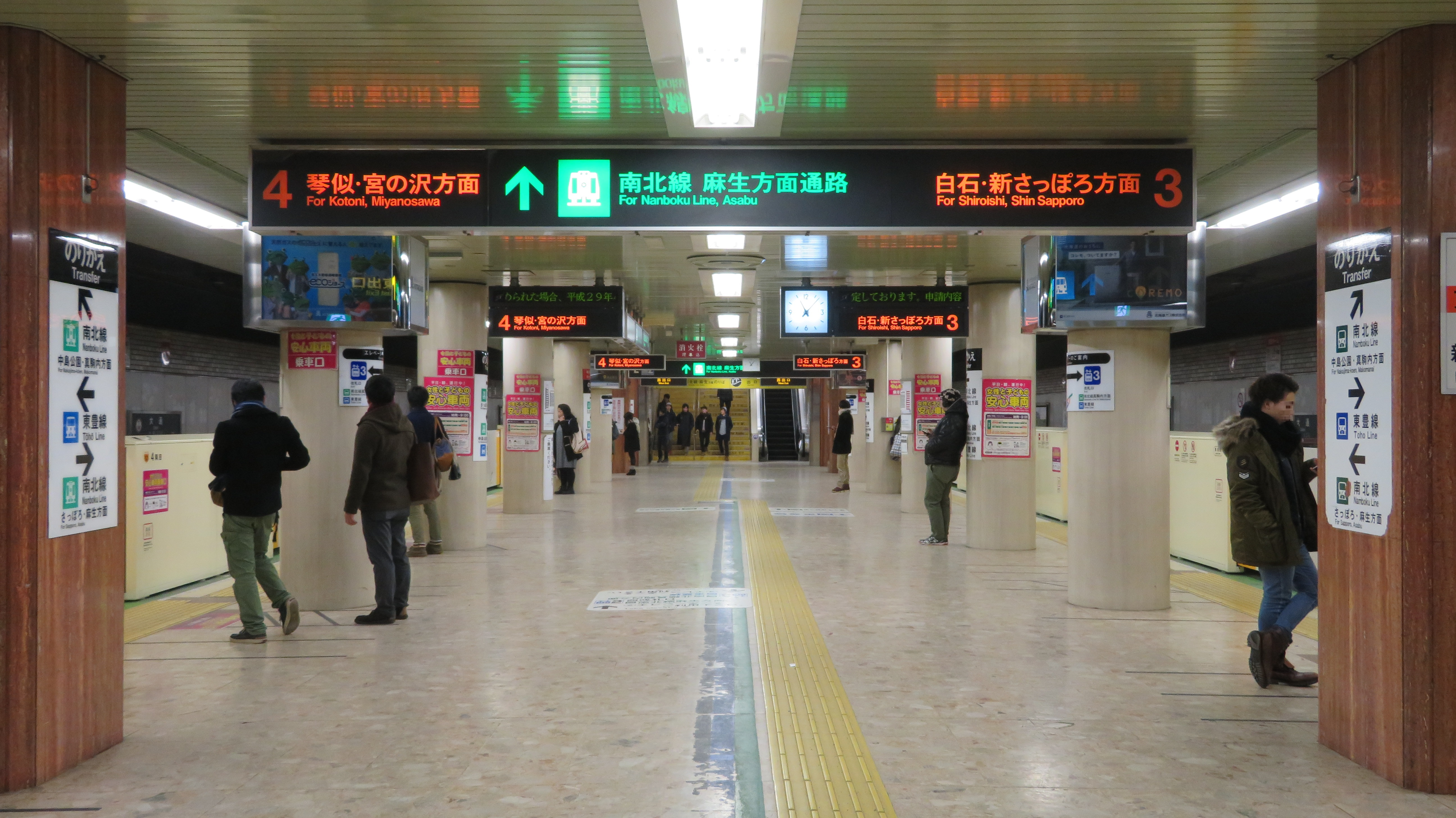
Tozai Line platform

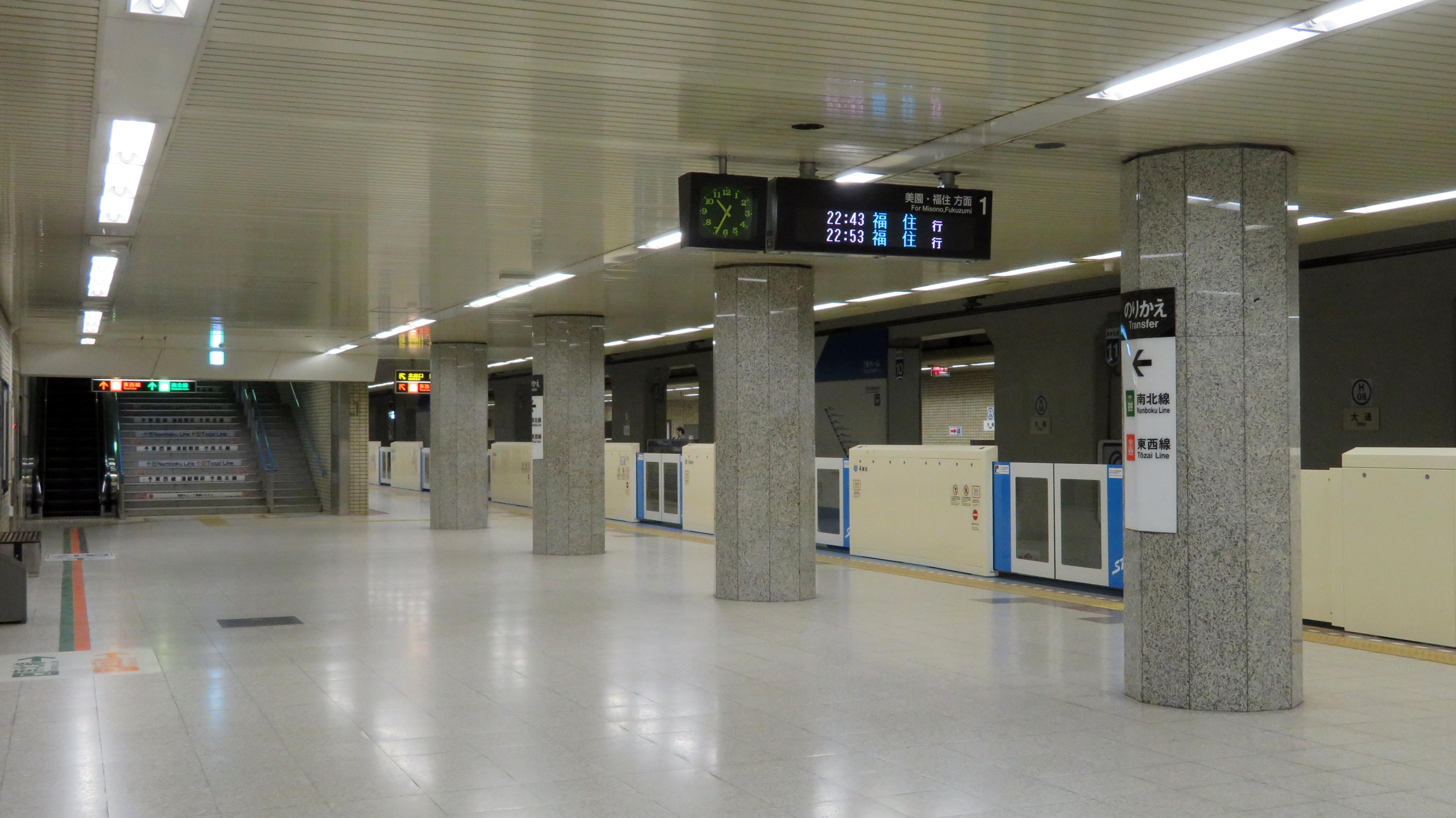
Toho Line platform

==== Namboku Line ====
1	■ Namboku Line	for Makomanai
2	■ Namboku Line	for Asabu

==== Tōzai Line ====
3	■ Tōzai Line	for Shin-Sapporo
4	■ Tōzai Line	for Miyanosawa

==== Tōhō Line ====
5(Toho Line Track No.1)	■ Tōhō Line	for Fukuzumi
6(Toho Line Track No.2)	■ Tōhō Line	for Sakaemachi

== Surrounding area ==
- Ōdōri Park
- 4th Ave (Sapporoeki-mae Avenue)
- Mitsukoshi
- Marui Imai
- Central business district
- Sapporo Citizens Hall
- Doshin Hall
- NHK Sapporo
- Sapporo TV Tower
- Sapporo Clock Tower
- Former Hokkaidō government office building
- Sapporo streetcar Nishi 4-Chome Station
- Hokkaido Police Headquarters
- Hokkaido University Botanical Gardens
- Tanukikoji shopping arcade
- Theater Kino
- Nijo fish market
- Hokkaido Chuo Bus Sapporo Terminal
- Odori bus Center Building
- Sapporo Grand Hotel

== See also ==
- List of railway stations in Japan
