= Tōhō Line =

Rubber-tyred rail line in Sapporo, Japan

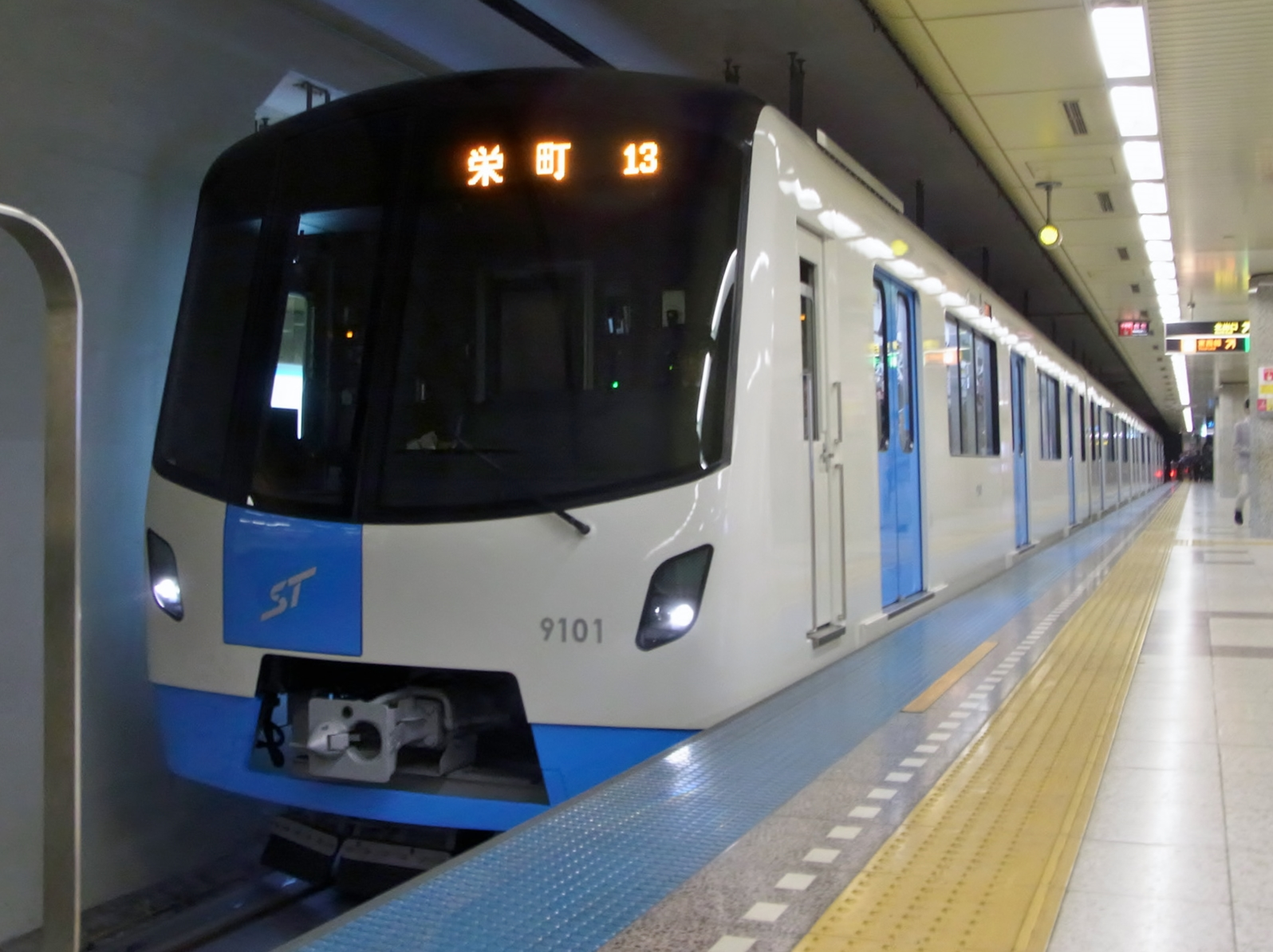
- A Toho Line 9000 series EMU at Ōdōri Station

Overview
- Native name: 東豊線
- Owner: Sapporo City Transportation Bureau
- Locale: Sapporo, Hokkaido
- Termini: Sakaemachi; Fukuzumi
- Stations: 14
- Color on map: Blue

Service
- Type: Rubber-tyred metro
- System: Sapporo Municipal Subway
- Rolling stock: 9000 series EMUs
- Daily ridership: 140,500 (2023 estimate)

History
- Opened: 2 December 1988; 37 years ago
- Last extension: 14 October 1994; 32 years ago

Technical
- Line length: 13.6 km (8.5 mi)
- Track gauge: Central guideway with rubber tires
- Electrification: 1,500 V DC overhead catenary
- Operating speed: 70 km/h (43 mph) (Maximum)
- Train protection system: ATC, ATO

The Tōhō Line (東豊線, Tōhō-sen; lit. 'Higashi-Toyohira Line' (Note: The name is a clipped compound of the two districts (ku) that the line connects. Higashi-ku (東区) is shortened to 東 read as on'yomi "tō", and Toyohira-ku (豊平区) is shortened to 豊 read as on'yomi "hō", forming "Tōhō".)) is a rubber-tyred metro line of the Sapporo Municipal Subway, serving Sapporo, Hokkaido, Japan. It runs from Sakaemachi Station in Higashi-ku to Fukuzumi Station in Toyohira-ku, with 14 stations. Its map color is blue, and its stations station designations use the Latin letter T (initial of Tōhō) followed by two digits.

== Station list ==
- All stations are located in Sapporo.
- The entire line is underground.

No.	Station name	Japanese	Distance (km)		Transfers	Location
No.	Station name	Japanese	Between stations	Total	Transfers	Location
H01	Sakaemachi	栄町	-	0.0		Higashi-ku
H02	Shindō-Higashi	新道東	0.9	0.9		Higashi-ku
H03	Motomachi	元町	1.2	2.1		Higashi-ku
H04	Kanjō-Dōri-Higashi	環状通東	1.4	3.5		Higashi-ku
H05	Higashi-Kuyakusho-Mae	東区役所前	1.0	4.5		Higashi-ku
H06	Kita-Jūsan-Jō-Higashi	北13条東	0.9	5.4		Higashi-ku
H07	Sapporo	さっぽろ	1.3	6.7	Namboku Line ( N06 ) Hakodate Main Line ( 01 )	Chūō-ku
H08	Ōdōri	大通	0.6	7.3	Namboku Line ( N07 ) Tōzai Line ( T09 ) Sapporo Streetcar (Nishi-Yon-Chōme)	Chūō-ku
H09	Hōsui-Susukino	豊水すすきの	0.8	8.1	Sapporo Streetcar (Susukino)	Chūō-ku
H10	Gakuen-Mae	学園前	1.4	9.5		Toyohira-ku
H11	Toyohira-Kōen	豊平公園	0.9	10.4		Toyohira-ku
H12	Misono	美園	1.0	11.4		Toyohira-ku
H13	Tsukisamu-Chūō	月寒中央	1.2	12.6		Toyohira-ku
H14	Fukuzumi	福住	1.0	13.6		Toyohira-ku

== Rolling stock ==
- 9000 series 4-car EMUs (since May 2015)

The first of a fleet of 20 new 9000 series four-car EMUs was introduced on the Tōhō Line in May 2015. Built by Kawasaki Heavy Industries in Kobe, the first trainset was unveiled to the media in November 2014. All 20 trains were scheduled to be in service by fiscal 2016, replacing the fleet of 7000 series trains.

=== Former rolling stock ===
- 7000 series 4-car EMUs (from 1988 until 2016)

From 1988 to 2016, the line was operated using a fleet of 20 four-car 7000 series EMUs (sets 7101 to 7120). The last 7000 series trains were withdrawn from service on June 25, 2016.

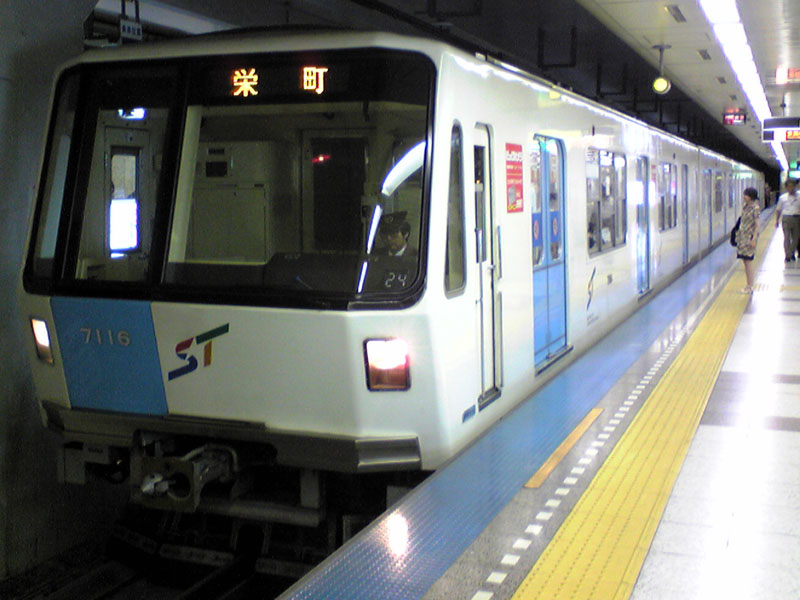
7000 series set 16 in July 2008

== History ==
The Sakaemachi to Hōsui-Susukino section opened on 2 December 1988. The Hōsui-Susukino to Fukuzumi section opened on 14 October 1994.

In 2023, the Tōhō Line recorded 140,500 daily riders, roughly 94% of 2019's total.

== Future developments ==
Platform edge doors are to be installed at all Tōhō Line stations by fiscal 2016.
