= Hōsui-Susukino Station =

Subway station in Sapporo, Japan

Coordinates: 43°3′18.818″N 141°21′22.906″E

H09 Hōsui-Susukino Station 豊水すすきの駅
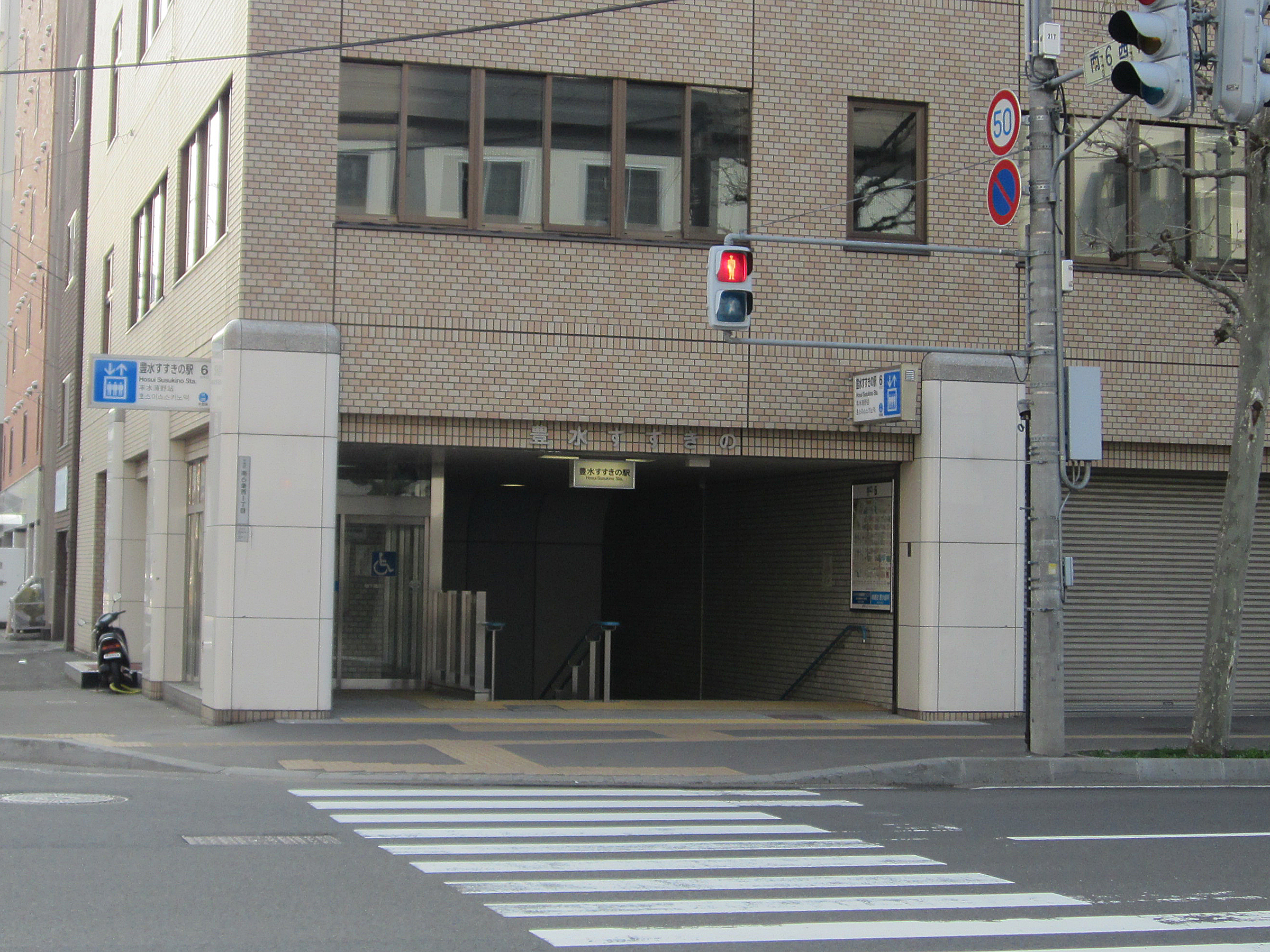
- Station exit 6

General information
- Location: Chūō, Sapporo, Hokkaido; Japan
- System: Sapporo Municipal Subway
- Operator: Sapporo City Transportation Bureau
- Line: Tōhō Line
- Platforms: 1 island platform
- Tracks: 2

Construction
- Accessible: Yes

Other information
- Station code: H09

History
- Opened: December 2, 1988; 37 years ago

Services
Preceding station	Sapporo Municipal Subway	Following station
Ōdōri H08 towards Sakaemachi	Tōhō Line	Gakuen-Mae H10 towards Fukuzumi
Location

Hōsui-Susukino Station (豊水すすきの駅) is a Sapporo Municipal Subway in Chūō-ku, Sapporo, Hokkaido, Japan. The station number is H09.

The station is situated relatively close to Susukino on the Namboku Line and the Sapporo Streetcar, but there are no free transfers between the two stations.

The first retail store, a Lawson, was opened in the station on January 31, 2019, after the station's Lawson kiosk was closed in July 2015.

== Platforms ==
1	■ Tōhō Line	for Fukuzumi
2	■ Tōhō Line	for Sakaemachi

== History ==
The station opened on 2 December 1988 coinciding with the opening of the Toho Line from Sakaemachi Station to this station. At the time of opening, Hosui-Susukino Station was the southern terminus of the Toho Line.

When the Toho Line was extended south in 1994, Fukuzumi Station became the new southern terminus of the Toho Line.

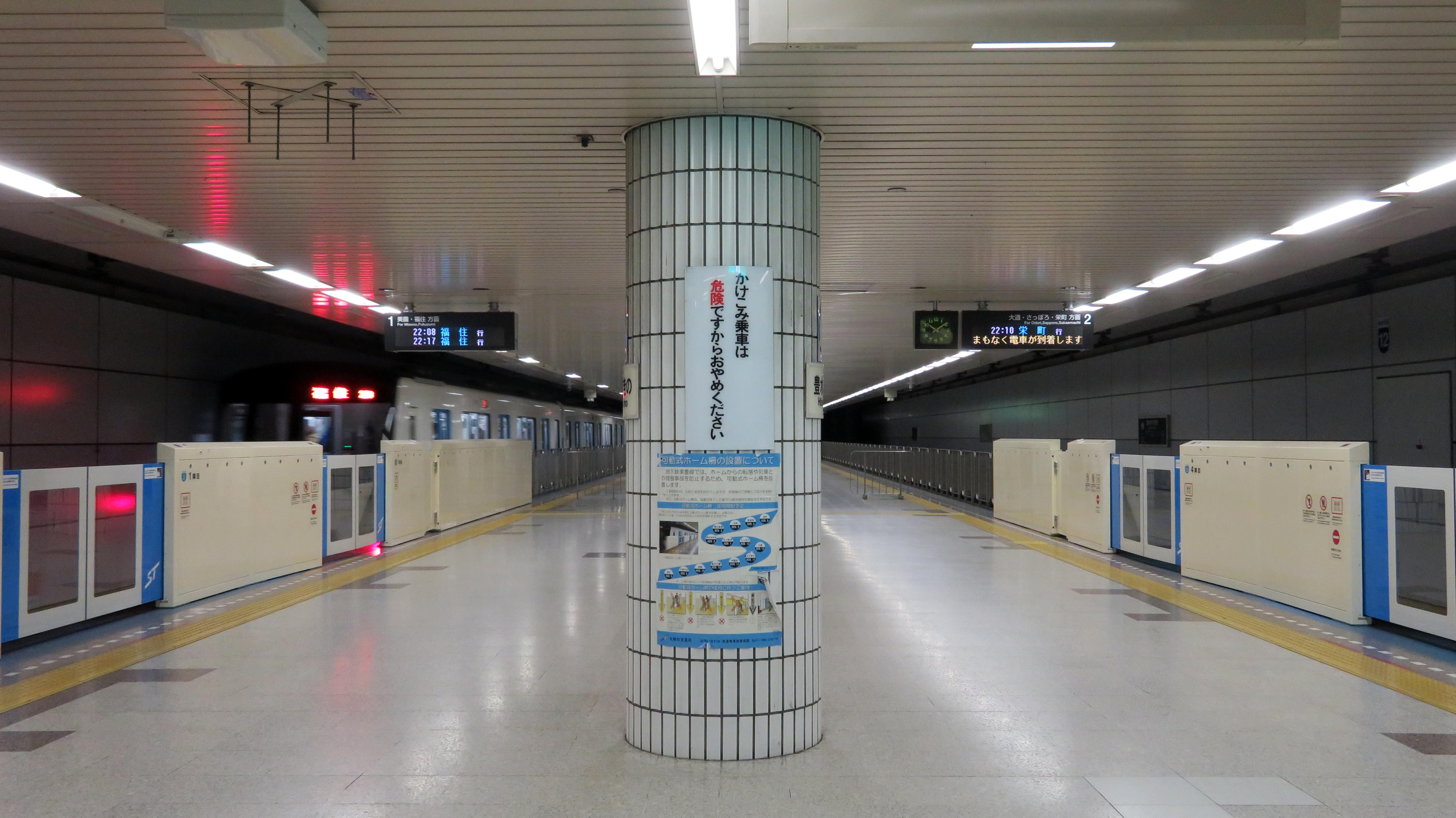
Station platform

== Surrounding area ==
- Japan National Route 36, (to Muroran)
- Hokkaido Bank, Susukino branch
