= Sakaemachi Station (Hokkaido) =

Subway station in Sapporo, Japan

Coordinates: 43°6′46.85″N 141°22′0.15″E

H01 Sakaemachi Station 栄町駅
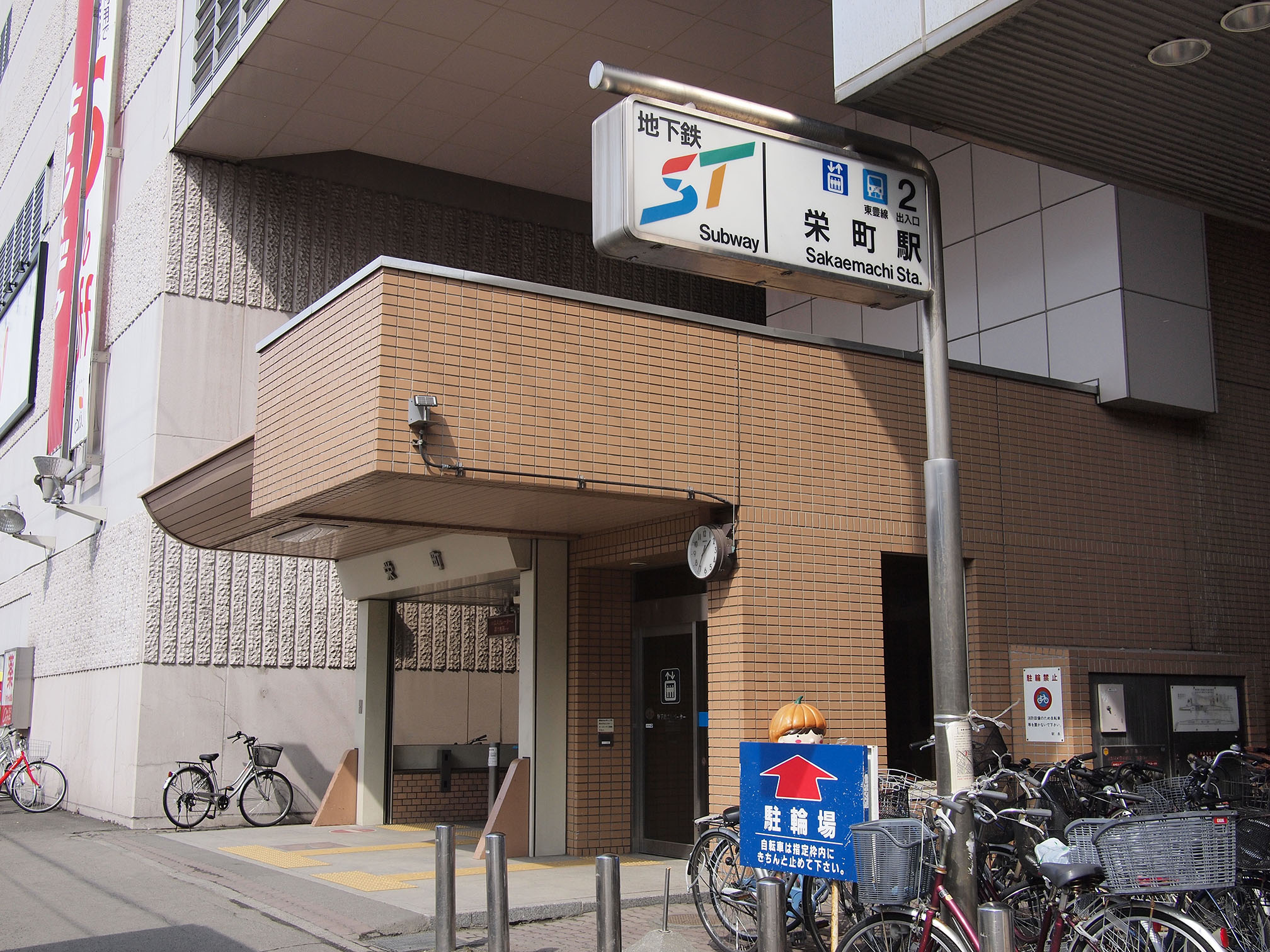

General information
- Location: Higashi, Sapporo, Hokkaido; Japan
- System: Sapporo Municipal Subway station
- Operator: Sapporo City Transportation Bureau
- Line: Tōhō Line

Construction
- Accessible: Yes

Other information
- Station code: H01

History
- Opened: 2 December 1988; 37 years ago

Passengers
- FY2023: 16,054 (daily)

Services
Preceding station	Sapporo Municipal Subway	Following station
Terminus	Tōhō Line	Shindō-Higashi H02 towards Fukuzumi
Location

Sakaemachi Station (栄町駅, Sakaemachi-eki) is a metro station in Higashi-ku, Sapporo, Hokkaido, Japan. The station number is H01. It is the northern terminus of the Tōhō Line and the northernmost underground railway station in Japan.

The Sapporo Community Dome is about 11 minutes' walking distance from the station.

== Platforms ==
1	■ Tōhō Line	for Fukuzumi
2	■ Tōhō Line	(Terminating trains)

== History ==
The station opened on 2 December 1988 coinciding with the opening of the Toho Line from this station to Hōsui-Susukino Station.

== Surrounding area ==
- Okadama Airport
- Sapporo Community Dome
- Japan Self-Defense Forces Okadama Garrison
