= Fukuzumi Station =

Subway station in Sapporo, Japan

Coordinates: 43°1′18.239″N 141°24′10.69″E

H14 Fukuzumi Station 福住駅
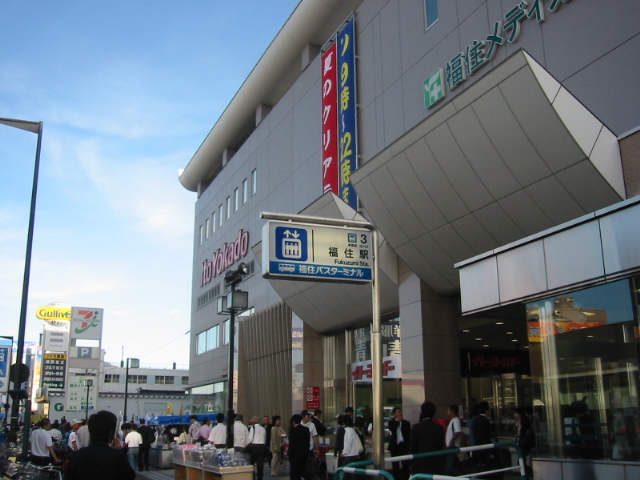
- Station front

General information
- Location: Chūō, Sapporo, Hokkaido; Japan
- System: Sapporo Municipal Subway station
- Operator: Sapporo City Transportation Bureau
- Line: Tōhō Line

Construction
- Accessible: Yes

Other information
- Station code: H14

History
- Opened: 1994; 32 years ago

Services
Preceding station	Sapporo Municipal Subway	Following station
Tsukisamu-Chūō H13 towards Sakaemachi	Tōhō Line	Terminus
Location

Fukuzumi Station (福住駅, Fukuzumi Eki) is a rapid transit station in Toyohira-ku, Sapporo, Hokkaido, Japan. The station number is H14. It is the southern terminus of the Tōhō Line.

The Sapporo Dome is about 10 minutes walking distance south of the station.

== Platforms ==
1	■ Tōhō Line	(Terminal Station)
2	■ Tōhō Line	for Sakaemachi

== History ==
The station opened on 14 October 1994 coinciding with the opening of the Toho Line extension from Hōsui-Susukino Station to this station.

== Surrounding area ==
- Sapporo Dome
- Tsukisamu Dome
- Japan National Route 36 (to Muroran)
