= Nishi-Nijūhatchōme Station =

Subway station in Sapporo, Japan

Coordinates: 43°3′37.567″N 141°18′53.031″E

T05 Nishi-Nijūhatchōme Station 西28丁目駅
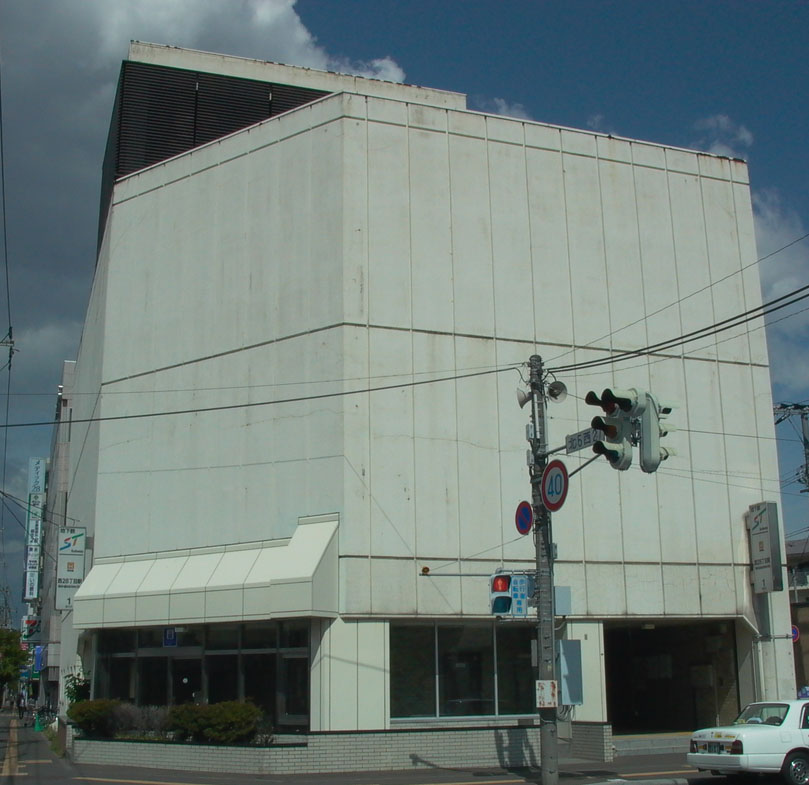
- Station exit

General information
- Location: Chūō, Sapporo, Hokkaido; Japan
- System: Sapporo Municipal Subway station
- Operator: Sapporo City Transportation Bureau
- Line: Tōzai Line

Construction
- Accessible: Yes

Other information
- Station code: T05

History
- Opened: 10 June 1976; 50 years ago

Services
Preceding station	Sapporo Municipal Subway	Following station
Nijūyon-Ken T04 towards Miyanosawa	Tōzai Line	Maruyama-Kōen T06 towards Shin-Sapporo
Location
- Location within Hokkaido Location within Japan

Nishi-Nijūhatchōme Station (西28丁目駅) is a Sapporo Municipal Subway station in Chūō-ku, Sapporo, Hokkaido, Japan. The station number is T05.

== Platforms ==
1	■ Tōzai Line	for Shin-Sapporo
2	■ Tōzai Line	for Miyanosawa

== History ==
The station opened on 10 June 1976 coinciding with the opening of the Tozai Line from Kotoni Station to Shiroishi Station.
