= Maruyama-Kōen Station =

Subway station in Sapporo, Japan

Coordinates: 43°3′20.502″N 141°19′8.692″E

T06 Maruyama-Kōen Station 円山公園駅
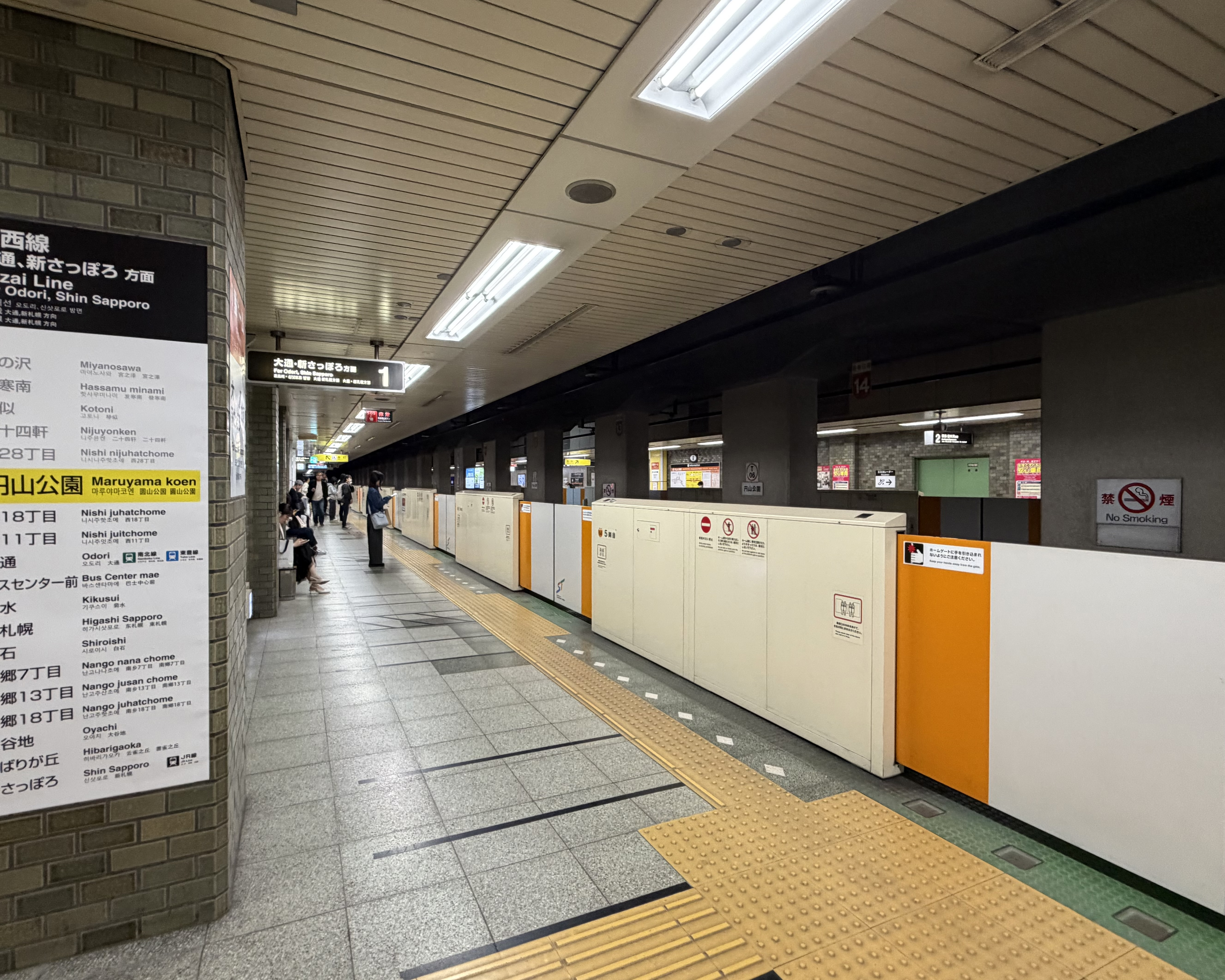
- Station platform, June 2026

General information
- Location: Chūō, Sapporo, Hokkaido; Japan
- System: Sapporo Municipal Subway station
- Operator: Sapporo City Transportation Bureau
- Line: Tōzai Line

Construction
- Accessible: Yes

Other information
- Station code: T06

History
- Opened: 10 June 1976; 50 years ago

Services
Preceding station	Sapporo Municipal Subway	Following station
Nishi-Nijūhatchōme T05 towards Miyanosawa	Tōzai Line	Nishi-Jūhatchōme T07 towards Shin-Sapporo
Location
- Location within Hokkaido Location within Japan

Maruyama-Kōen Station (円山公園駅, Maruyama-kōen-eki) is a Sapporo Municipal Subway station in Chūō-ku, Sapporo, Hokkaido, Japan. The station is numbered T06.

The station takes its name from the Maruyama Park, located 300 m west of the station.

== Platforms ==
1	■ Tōzai Line	for Shin-Sapporo
2	■ Tōzai Line	for Miyanosawa

== History ==
The station opened on 10 June 1976 coinciding with the opening of the Tozai Line from Kotoni Station to Shiroishi Station.

== Surrounding area ==
- Maruyama Park
- Sapporo Maruyama Zoo
- Hokkaidō Shrine
- Maruyama Baseball Stadium
