= Bus Center-Mae Station =

Subway station in Sapporo, Japan

Coordinates: 43°3′40.878″N 141°21′37.47″E

T10 Bus Center-Mae Station バスセンター前駅
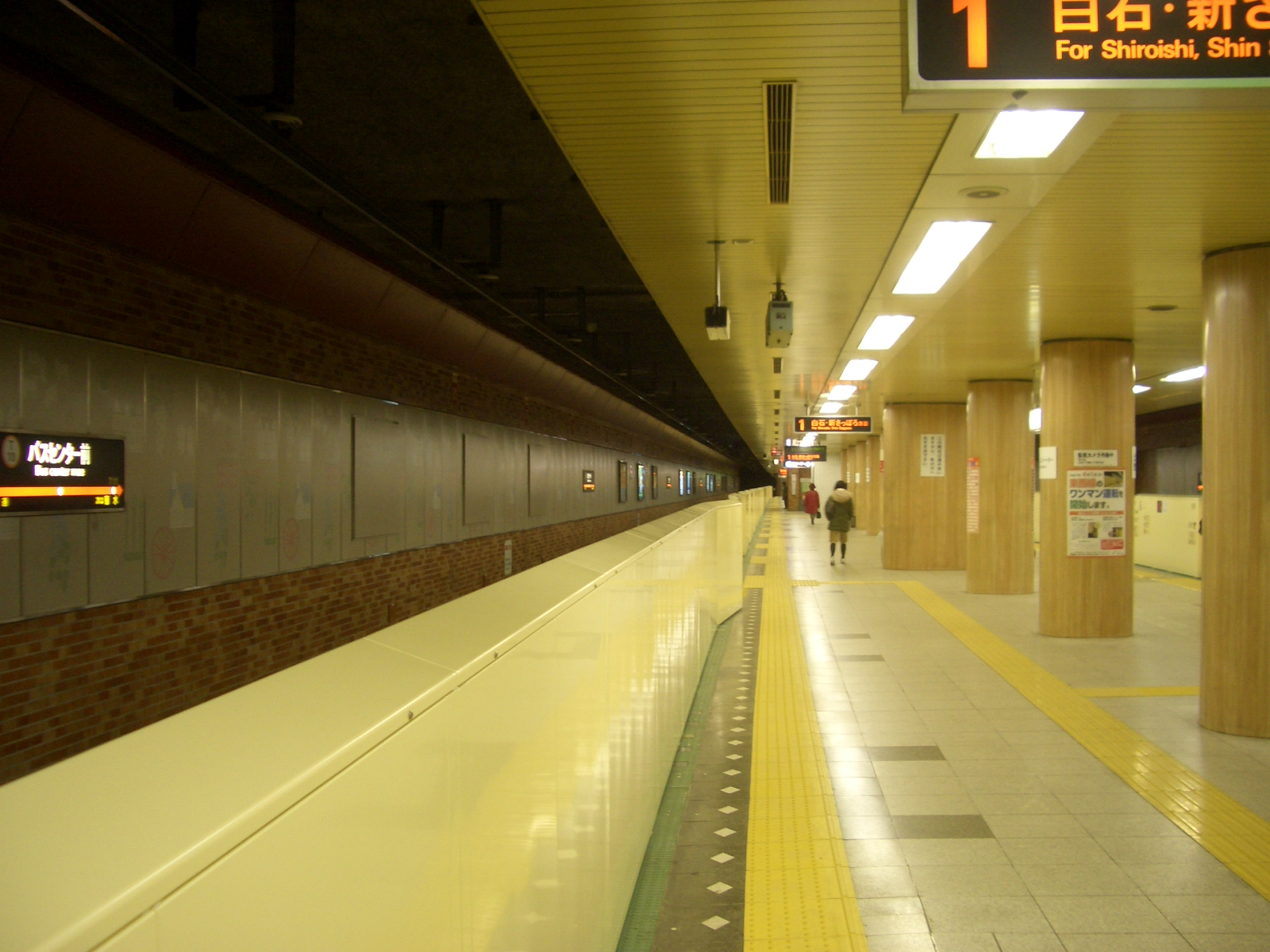
- Station platform, March 2009

General information
- Location: Chūō, Sapporo, Hokkaido; Japan
- System: Sapporo Municipal Subway station
- Operator: Sapporo City Transportation Bureau
- Line: Tōzai Line
- Platforms: 1 island platform
- Tracks: 2
- Connections: Odori Bus Center; Hokkaido Chuo Bus Sapporo Terminal

Construction
- Accessible: Yes

Other information
- Station code: T10

History
- Opened: 10 June 1976; 50 years ago

Services
Preceding station	Sapporo Municipal Subway	Following station
Ōdōri T09 towards Miyanosawa	Tōzai Line	Kikusui T11 towards Shin-Sapporo
Location
- Location within Hokkaido Location within Japan

Bus Center-Mae Station (バスセンター前駅, Basusentā-Mae-eki) is a metro station in Chūō-ku, Sapporo, Hokkaido, Japan. The station is numbered T10.

== Platforms ==
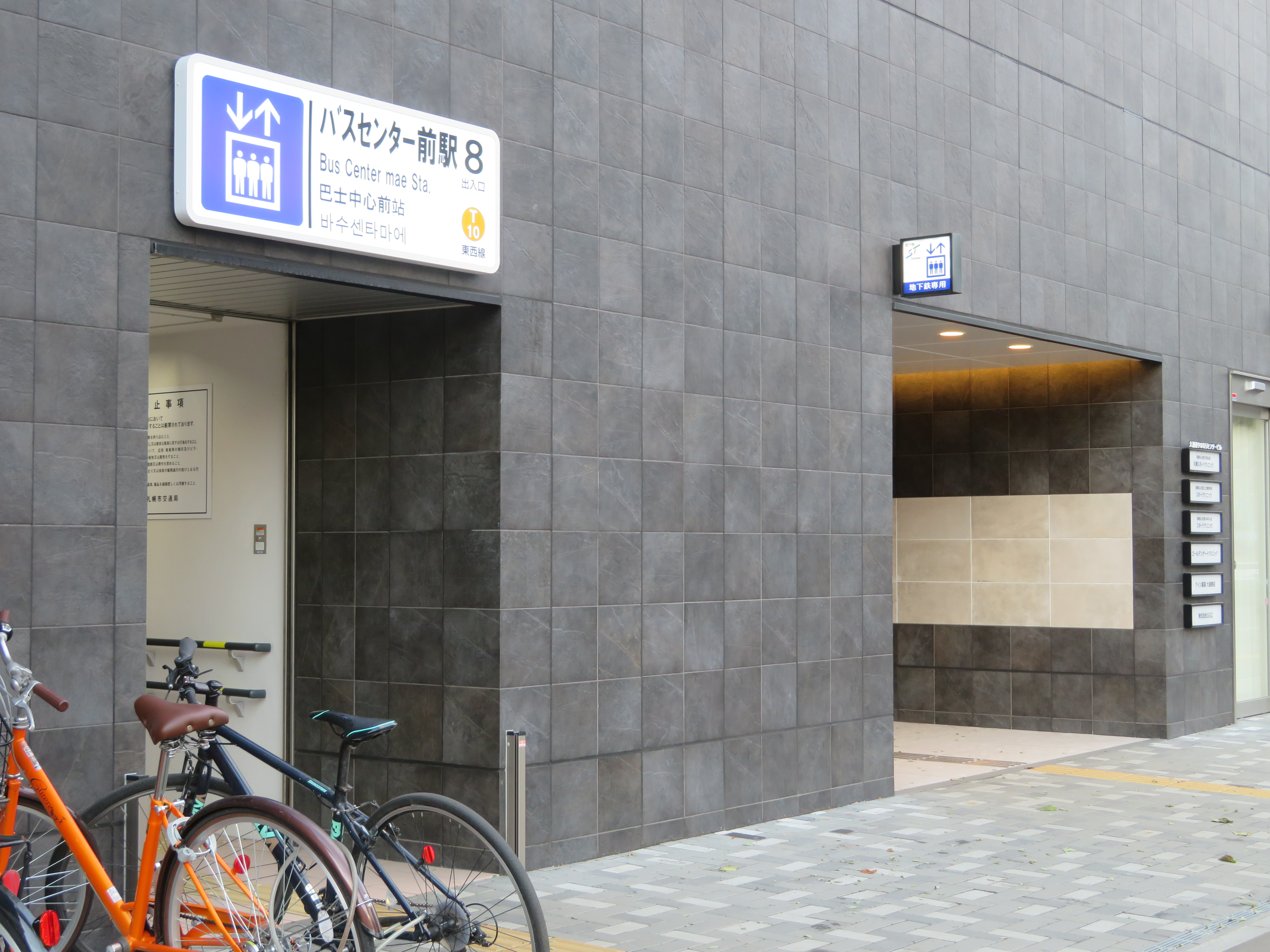
Station entrance (November 2016)

1	■ Tōzai Line	for Shin-Sapporo
2	■ Tōzai Line	for Miyanosawa

== History ==
The station opened on 10 June 1976 coinciding with the opening of the Tozai Line from Kotoni Station to Shiroishi Station.

== Surrounding area ==
- Old Mansion Nagayama, Nagayama Memorial Park
- Hokkaido Electric Power building
- Chuo-ku Higashi Community Development Center
- Sapporo Factory shopping mall
- TV Hokkaido
- Sapporo Municipal Central gymnasium
- Sapporo City Gallery (Museum)
- Hokkaido-Shiki Theatre

== Odori Bus Center ==
There is the Odori Bus Center just above this station.

=== Highway buses ===
- Wakkanai/Hamanasu; For Wakkanai Station and Wakkanai Ferry Terminal
- Esashi; For Otoineppu Station, Nakatonbetsu, Utanobori, and Esashi
- Aurora; For Nakashibetsu, Betsukai, Attoko Station, and Nemuro Station
- Kushiro Tokkyu New Star; For Shiranuka Station, Otanoshike Station, and Kushiro Station
- Setana; For Oshamambe, Imakane, Kitahiyama, and Setana
- Hakodate Tokkyu New Star; For Goryōkaku Station, Hakodate Station, and Yunokawa Onsen,
