= Kikusui Station =

Subway station in Sapporo, Japan

Coordinates: 43°3′26.241″N 141°22′22.06″E

T11 Kikusui Station 菊水駅
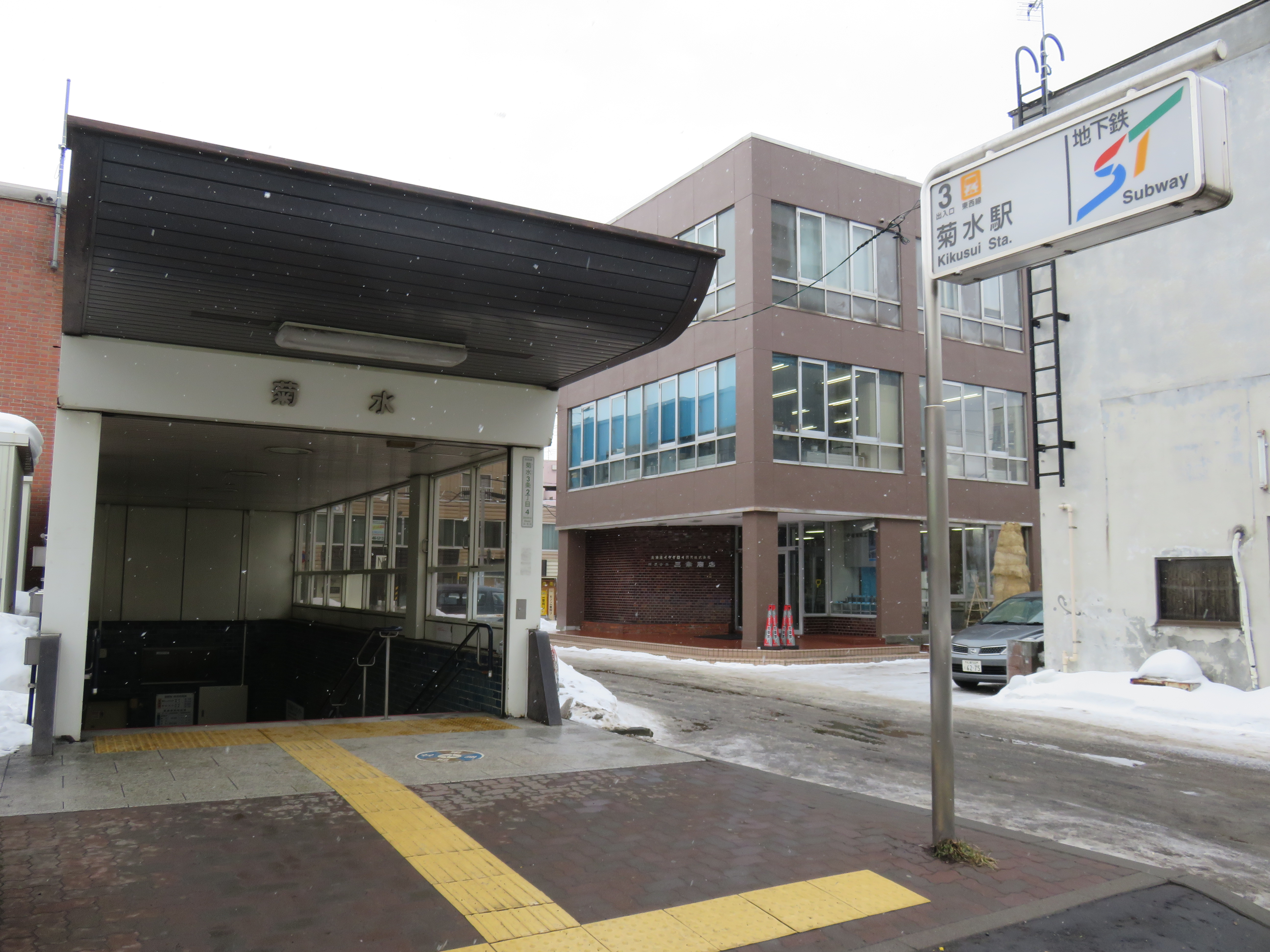
- Station entrance, 2016

General information
- Location: Shiroishi, Sapporo, Hokkaido; Japan
- System: Sapporo Municipal Subway station
- Operator: Sapporo City Transportation Bureau
- Line: Tōzai Line

Construction
- Accessible: Yes

Other information
- Station code: T11

History
- Opened: 10 June 1976; 50 years ago

Services
Preceding station	Sapporo Municipal Subway	Following station
Bus Center-Mae T10 towards Miyanosawa	Tōzai Line	Higashi-Sapporo T12 towards Shin-Sapporo
Location
- Location within Hokkaido Location within Japan

Kikusui Station (菊水駅) is a Sapporo Municipal Subway station in Shiroishi-ku, Sapporo, Hokkaido, Japan. Its station number is T11.

== Platforms ==
1	■ Tōzai Line	for Shin-Sapporo
2	■ Tōzai Line	for Miyanosawa

== History ==
The station opened on 10 June 1976 simultaneously with the opening of the Tozai Line from Kotoni Station to Shiroishi Station.

== Surrounding area ==
- Japan National Route 36
- Sapporo City Hall Building
- National Hospital Organization Hokkaido Cancer Center
- Sapporo Kin'ikyo Hospital
- Hokkaido Computer School HCS, (college)
- Shiraishi Police Department
- Sapporo Kikusui Sanjo Post Office
- ARCS super store, Kikusui
- Maxvalu supermarket, Kikusui

== Gallery ==
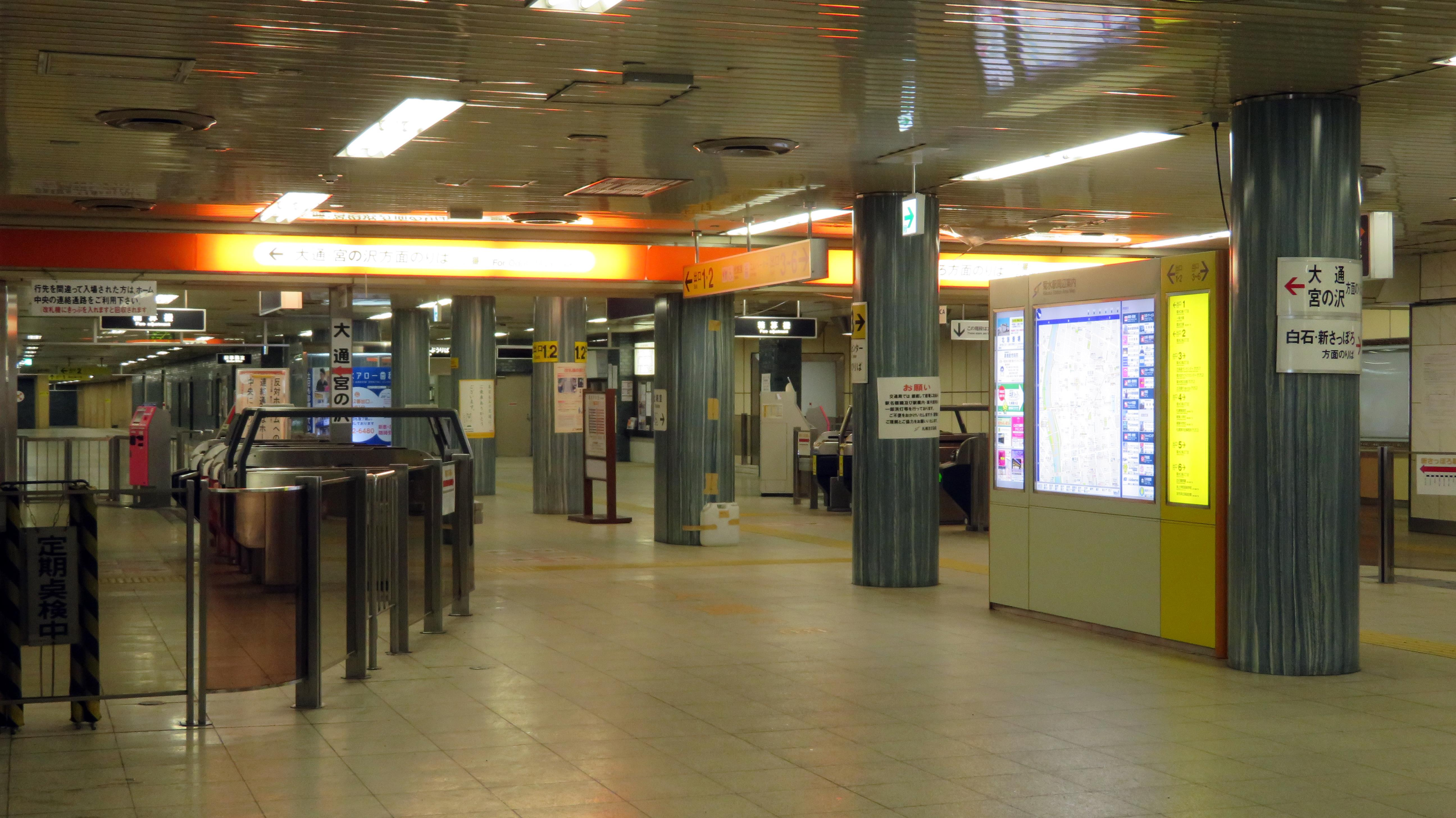
Ticket gates
