= Higashi-Sapporo Station =

Subway station in Sapporo, Japan

Coordinates: 43°3′7.366″N 141°23′3.63″E

T12 Higashi-Sapporo Station 東札幌駅
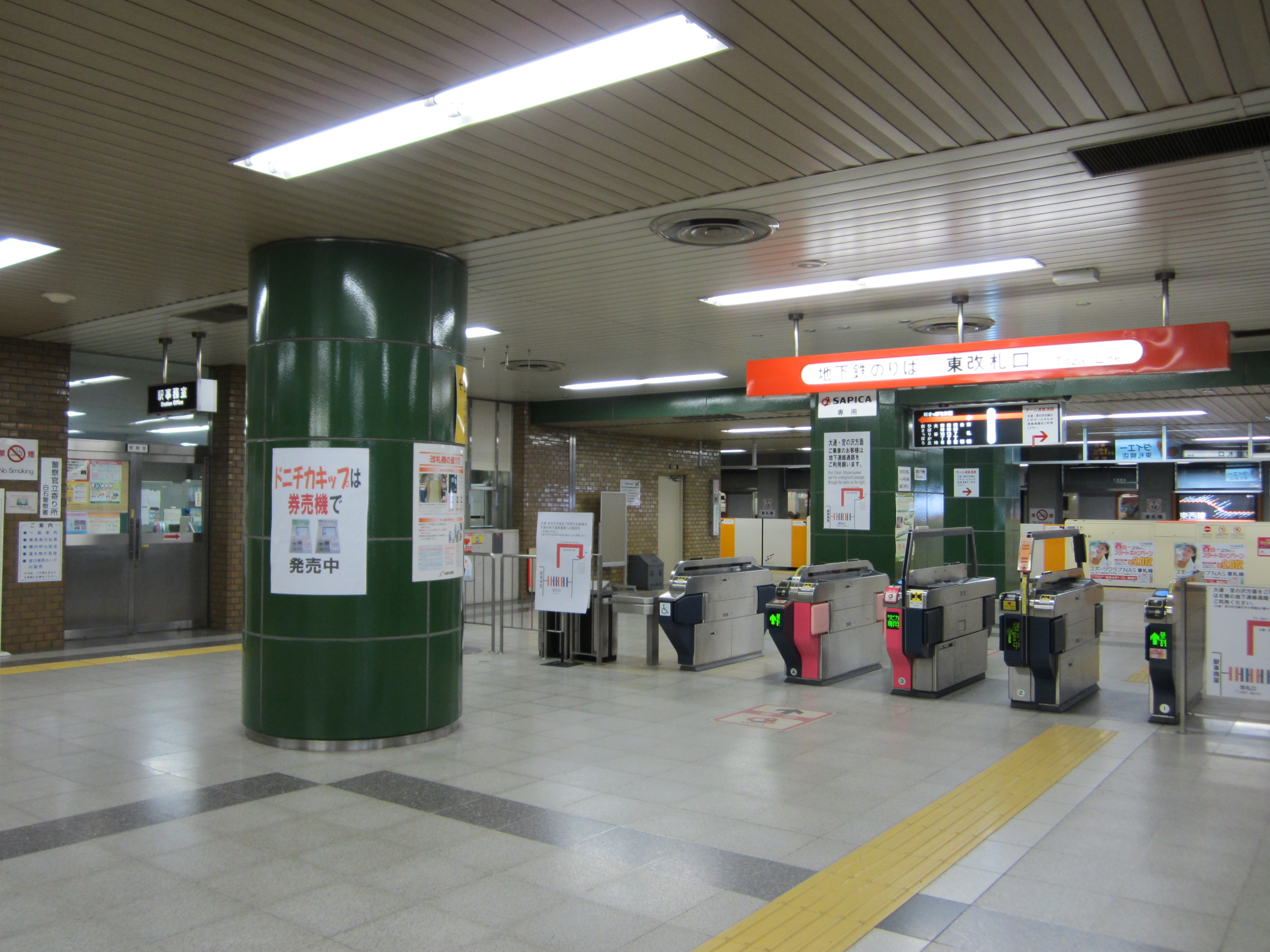
- Station ticket gates

General information
- Location: Shiroishi, Sapporo, Hokkaido; Japan
- System: Sapporo Municipal Subway station
- Operator: Sapporo City Transportation Bureau
- Line: Tōzai Line

Construction
- Accessible: Yes

Other information
- Station code: T12

History
- Opened: 10 June 1976; 50 years ago

Services
Preceding station	Sapporo Municipal Subway	Following station
Kikusui T11 towards Miyanosawa	Tōzai Line	Shiroishi T13 towards Shin-Sapporo
Location
- Location within Hokkaido Location within Japan

Higashi-Sapporo Station (東札幌駅, Higashi-Sapporo-eki; lit. 'East Sapporo Station') is a Sapporo Municipal Subway station in Shiroishi-ku, Sapporo, Hokkaido, Japan. The station number is T12.

== Platforms ==
1	■ Tōzai Line	for Shin-Sapporo
2	■ Tōzai Line	for Miyanosawa

== History ==
The station opened on 10 June 1976 coinciding with the opening of the Tozai Line from Kotoni Station to Shiroishi Station.

== Surrounding area ==
- Sapporo Convention Center
