= Nangō-Jūsan-Chōme Station =

Subway station in Sapporo, Japan

Coordinates: 43°2′8.737″N 141°25′21.862″E

T15 Nangō-Jūsan-Chōme Station 南郷13丁目駅
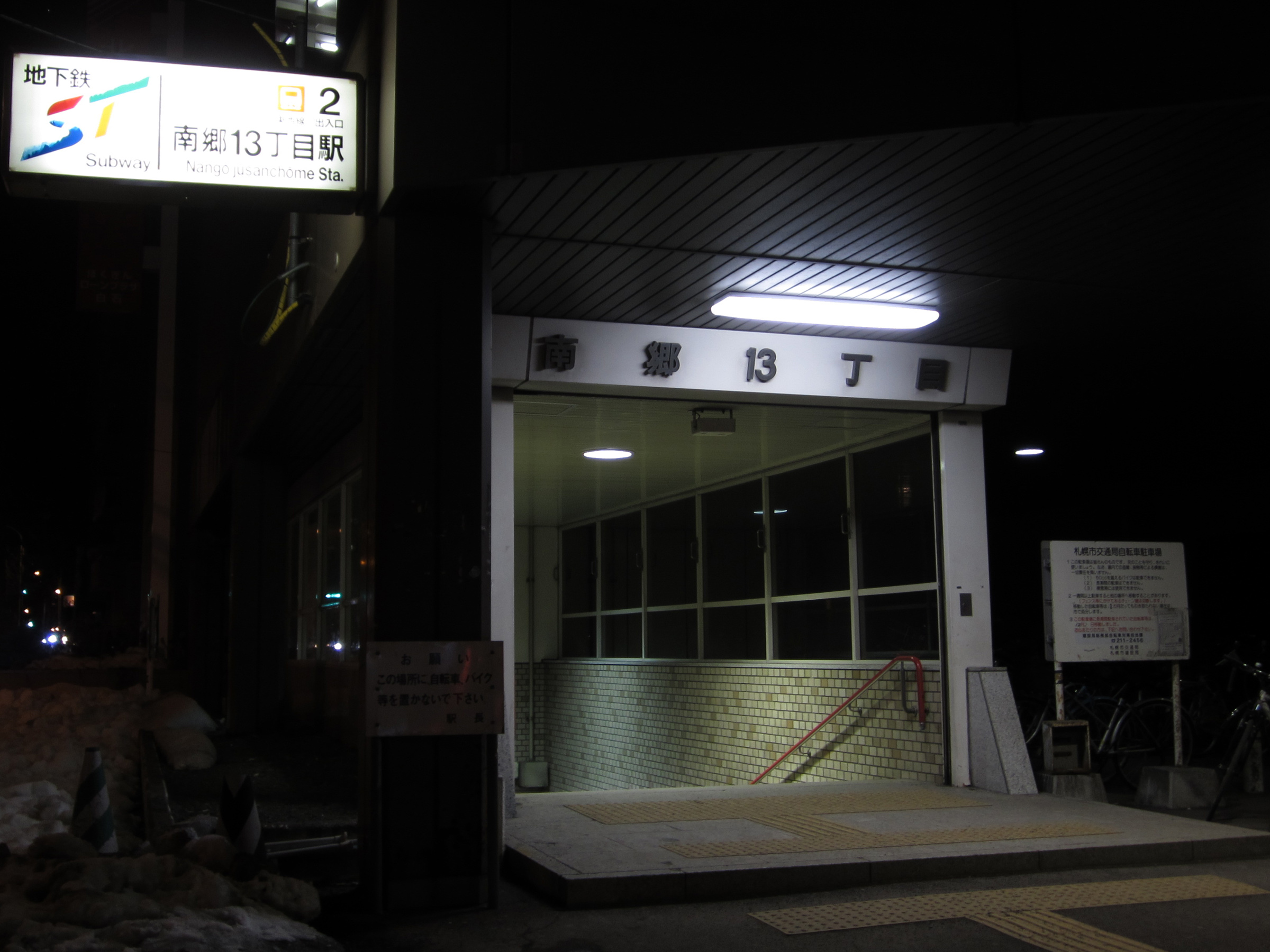
- Station exit 2

General information
- Location: Shiroishi, Sapporo, Hokkaido; Japan
- System: Sapporo Municipal Subway station
- Operator: Sapporo City Transportation Bureau
- Line: Tōzai Line

Construction
- Accessible: Yes

Other information
- Station code: T15

History
- Opened: March 21, 1982; 44 years ago

Services
Preceding station	Sapporo Municipal Subway	Following station
Nangō-Nana-Chōme T14 towards Miyanosawa	Tōzai Line	Nangō-Jūhatchōme T16 towards Shin-Sapporo
Location
- Location within Hokkaido Location within Japan

Nangō-Jūsan-Chōme Station (南郷13丁目駅) is a Sapporo Municipal Subway station in Shiroishi-ku, Sapporo, Hokkaido, Japan. The station number is T15.

== Platforms ==
The station has two side platforms serving two tracks on the second basement level.

1	■ Tōzai Line	for Shin-Sapporo
2	■ Tōzai Line	for Miyanosawa

== History ==
The station opened on 21 March 1982 coinciding with the opening of the Tozai Line extension from Shiroishi Station to Shin-Sapporo Station.

== Surrounding area ==
- Japan National Route 12 (to Asahikawa)

== Gallery ==
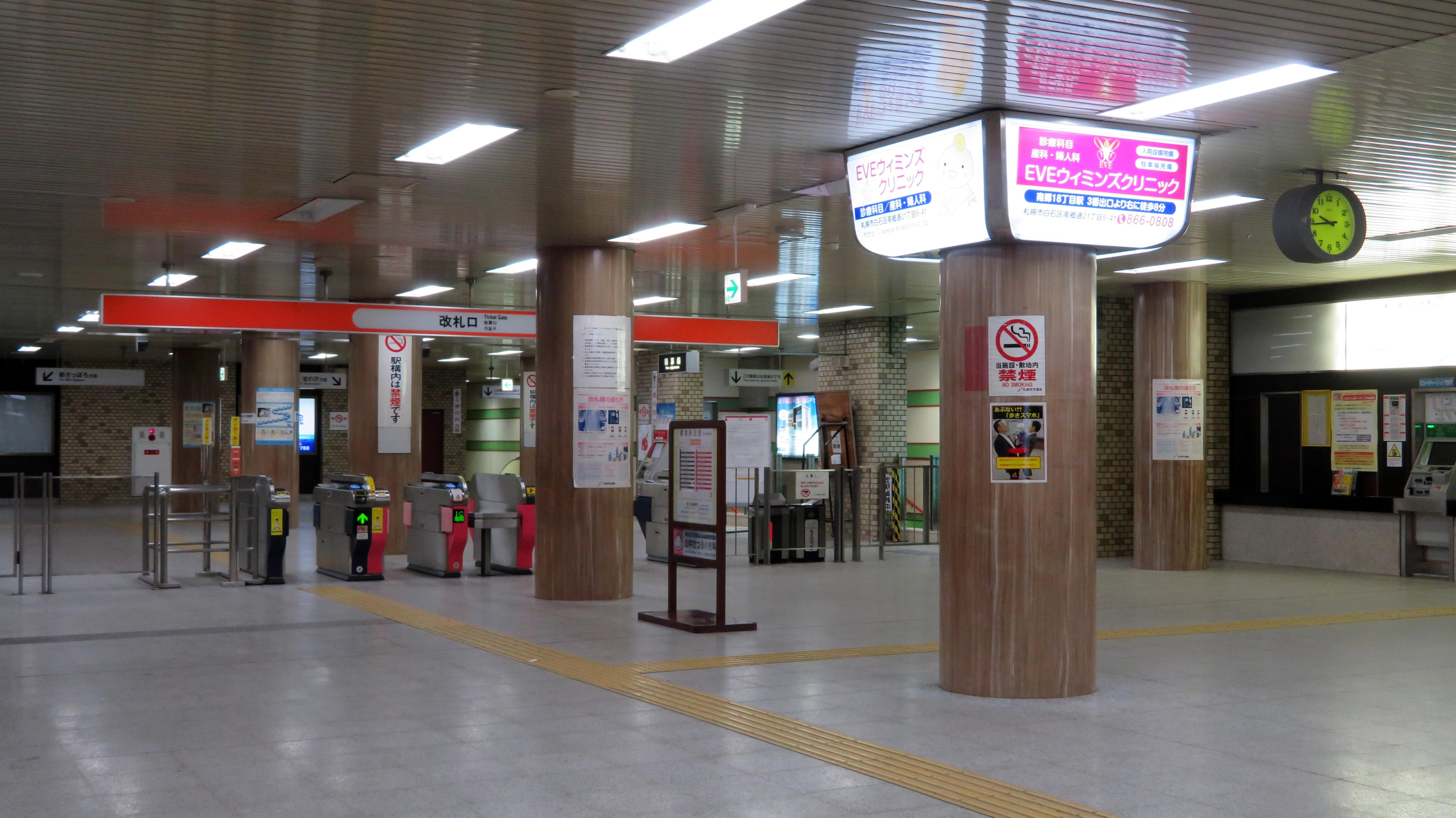
Ticket gates

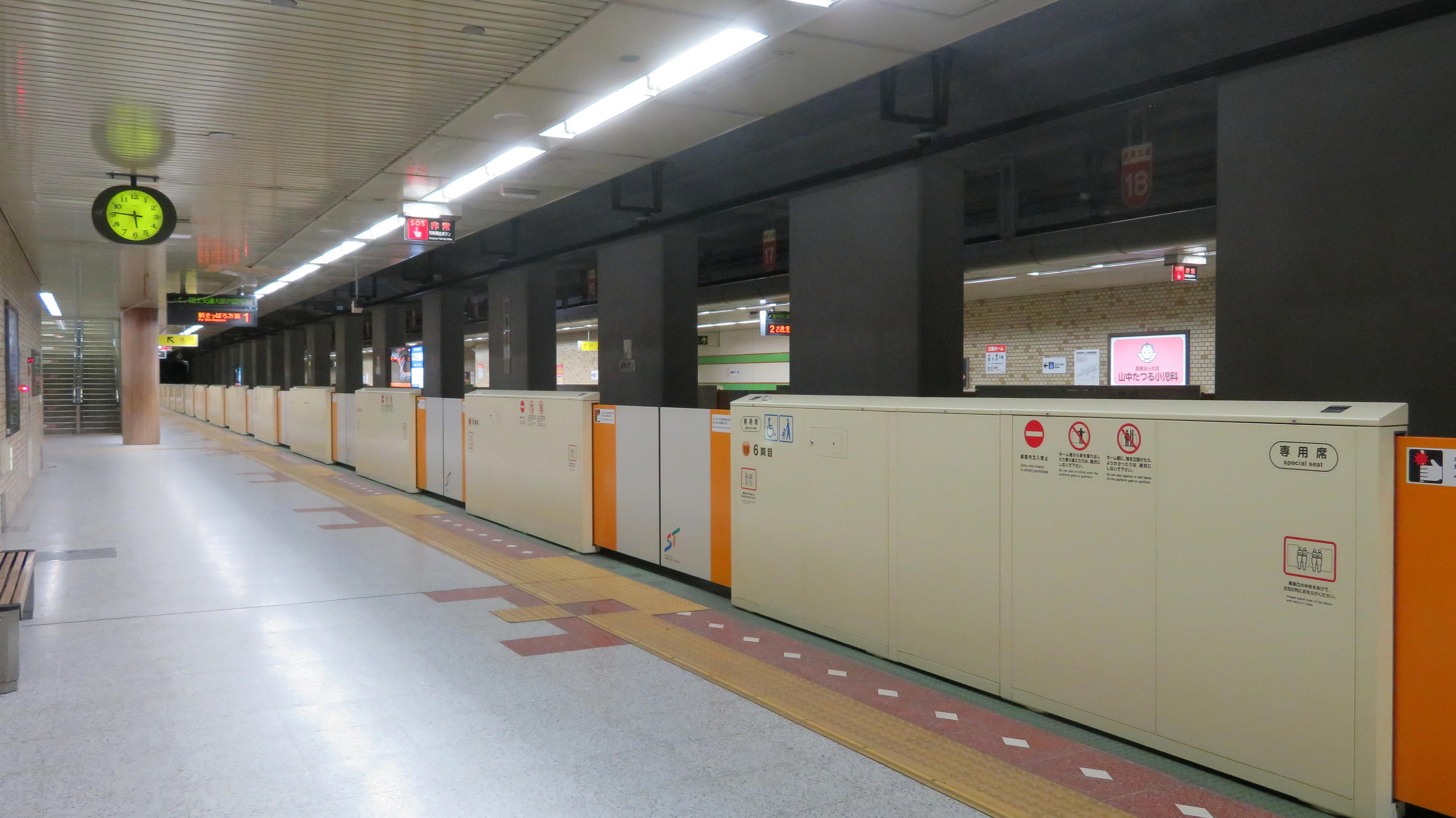
Station platforms
