= Nijūyon-Ken Station =

Subway station in Sapporo, Japan

T04 Nijūyon-Ken Station 二十四軒駅
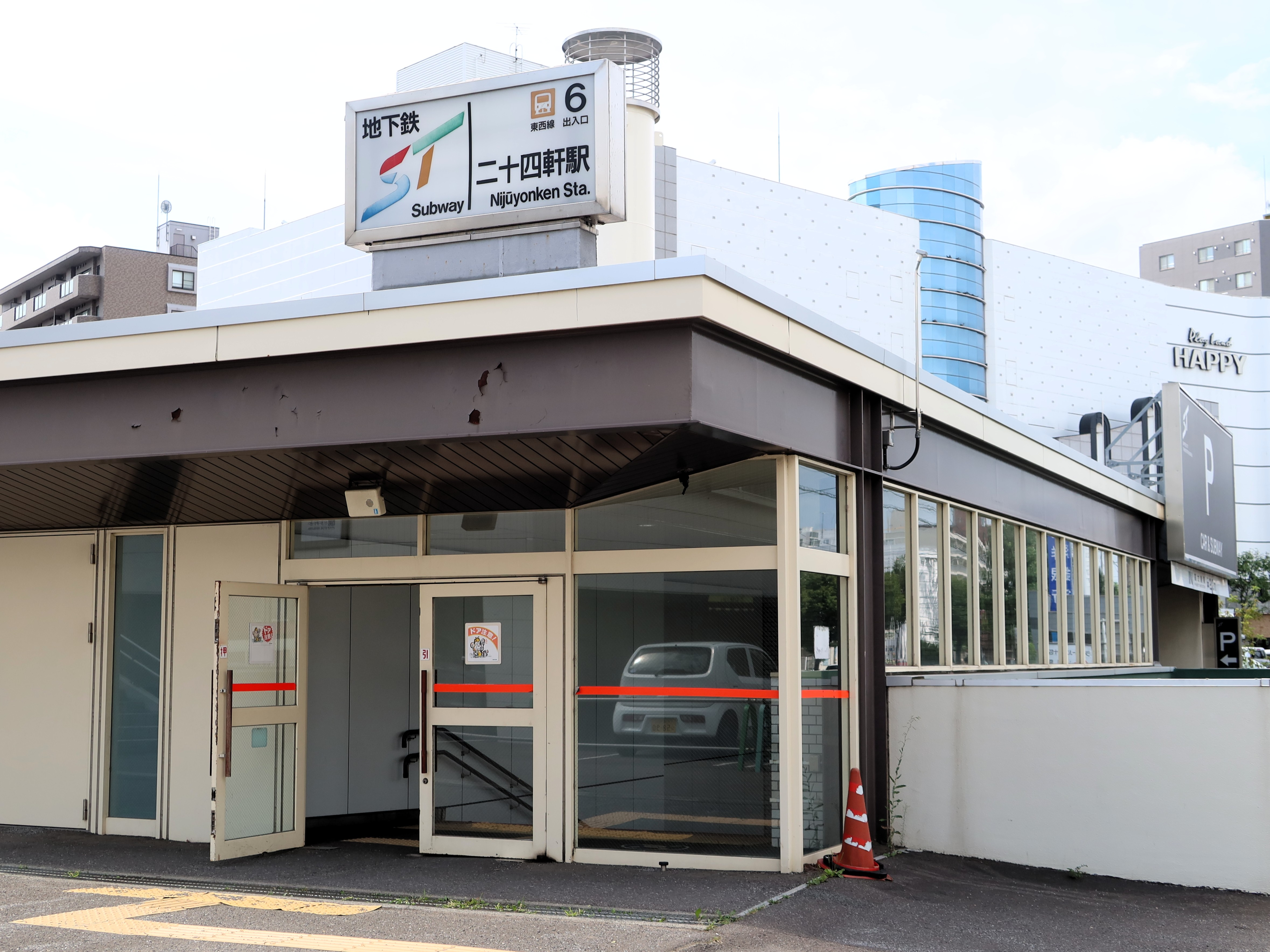
- Exit 6

General information
- Location: 1-4 Nijūyon-Ken; Nishi, Sapporo, Hokkaido; Japan
- Coordinates: 43°4′13.029″N 141°18′50.676″E
- System: Sapporo Municipal Subway station
- Operator: Sapporo City Transportation Bureau
- Line: Tōzai Line

Construction
- Accessible: Yes

Other information
- Station code: T04

History
- Opened: 10 June 1976; 50 years ago

Services
Preceding station	Sapporo Municipal Subway	Following station
Kotoni T03 towards Miyanosawa	Tōzai Line	Nishi-Nijūhatchōme T05 towards Shin-Sapporo
Location
- Location within Hokkaido Location within Japan

Nijūyon-Ken Station (二十四軒駅) is a Sapporo Municipal Subway station in Nishi-ku, Sapporo, Hokkaido, Japan. The station number is T04.

== Platforms ==
1	■ Tōzai Line	for Shin-Sapporo
2	■ Tōzai Line	for Miyanosawa

== History ==
The station opened on 10 June 1976 coinciding with the opening of the Tozai Line from Kotoni Station to Shiroishi Station.

== Surrounding area ==
- Sapporo Racecourse
