= Ōyachi Station (Hokkaido) =

Subway station in Sapporo, Japan

Coordinates: 43°1′40.094″N 141°27′11.603″E

T17 Ōyachi Station 大谷地駅
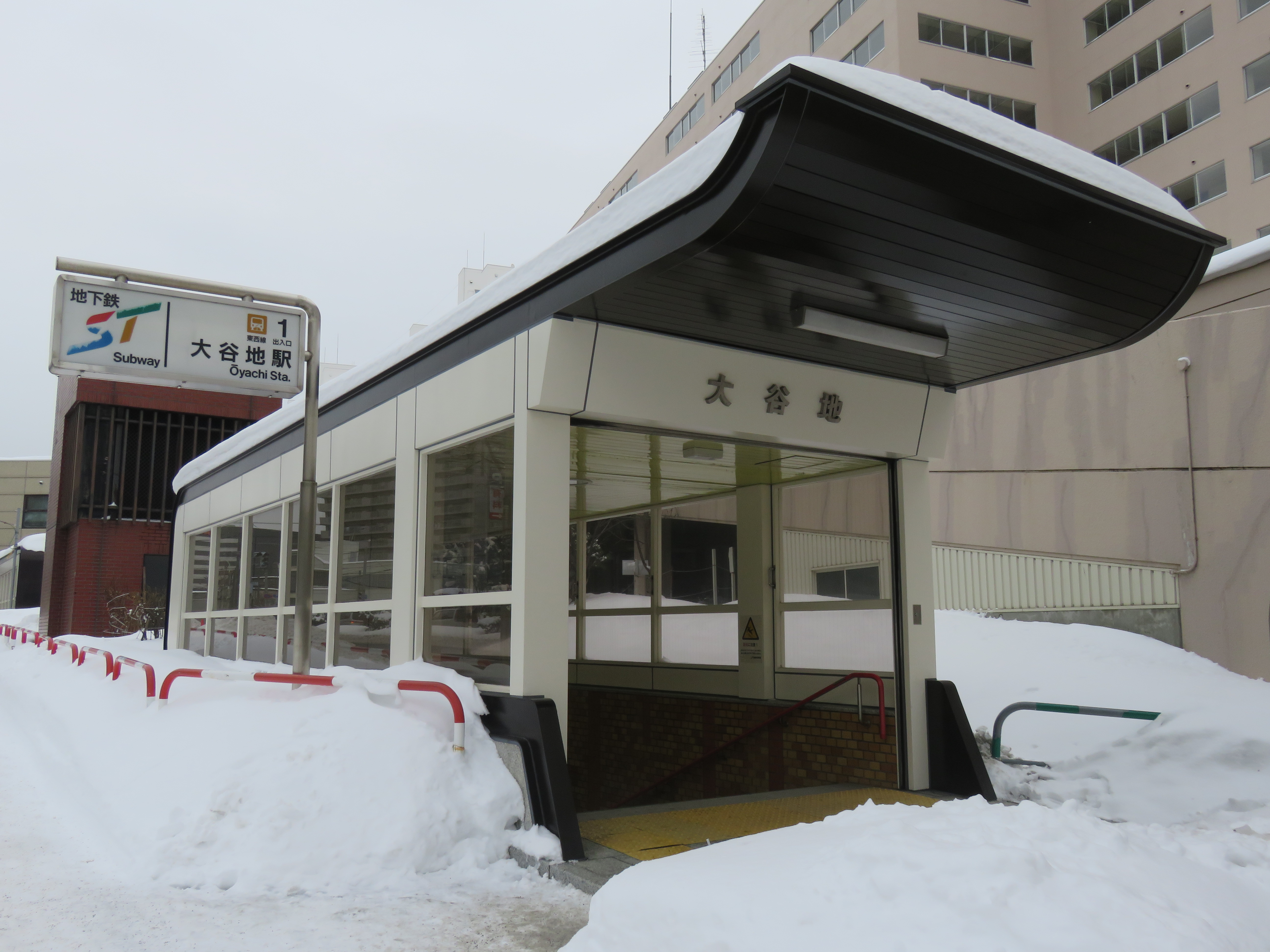
- Station exit

General information
- Location: Atsubetsu, Sapporo, Hokkaido; Japan
- System: Sapporo Municipal Subway station
- Operator: Sapporo City Transportation Bureau
- Line: Tōzai Line

Construction
- Accessible: Yes

Other information
- Station code: T17

History
- Opened: March 21, 1982; 44 years ago

Services
Preceding station	Sapporo Municipal Subway	Following station
Nangō-Jūhatchōme T16 towards Miyanosawa	Tōzai Line	Hibarigaoka T18 towards Shin-Sapporo
Location
- Location within Hokkaido Location within Japan

Ōyachi Station (大谷地駅, Ōyachi-eki) is a Sapporo Municipal Subway station in Atsubetsu-ku, Sapporo, Hokkaido, Japan. The station is numbered T17.

The station is the closest to Sapporo Atsubetsu Park Stadium, home to Consadole Sapporo.

== Platforms ==
1	■ Tōzai Line	for Shin-Sapporo
2	■ Tōzai Line	for Miyanosawa

== History ==
The station opened on 21 March 1982 coinciding with the opening of the Tozai Line extension from Shiroishi Station to Shin-Sapporo Station.

== Surrounding area ==
- Hokusei Gakuen University
- National Route 12 (to Asahikawa)
- Sapporo Atsubetsu Park Stadium, 20 minutes' walk from the station
- Sapporo Ryūtsū Center (Axes Sapporo)
