= Nangō-Jūhatchōme Station =

Subway station in Sapporo, Japan

Coordinates: 43°1′49.042″N 141°26′6.900″E

T16 Nangō-Jūhatchōme Station 南郷18丁目駅
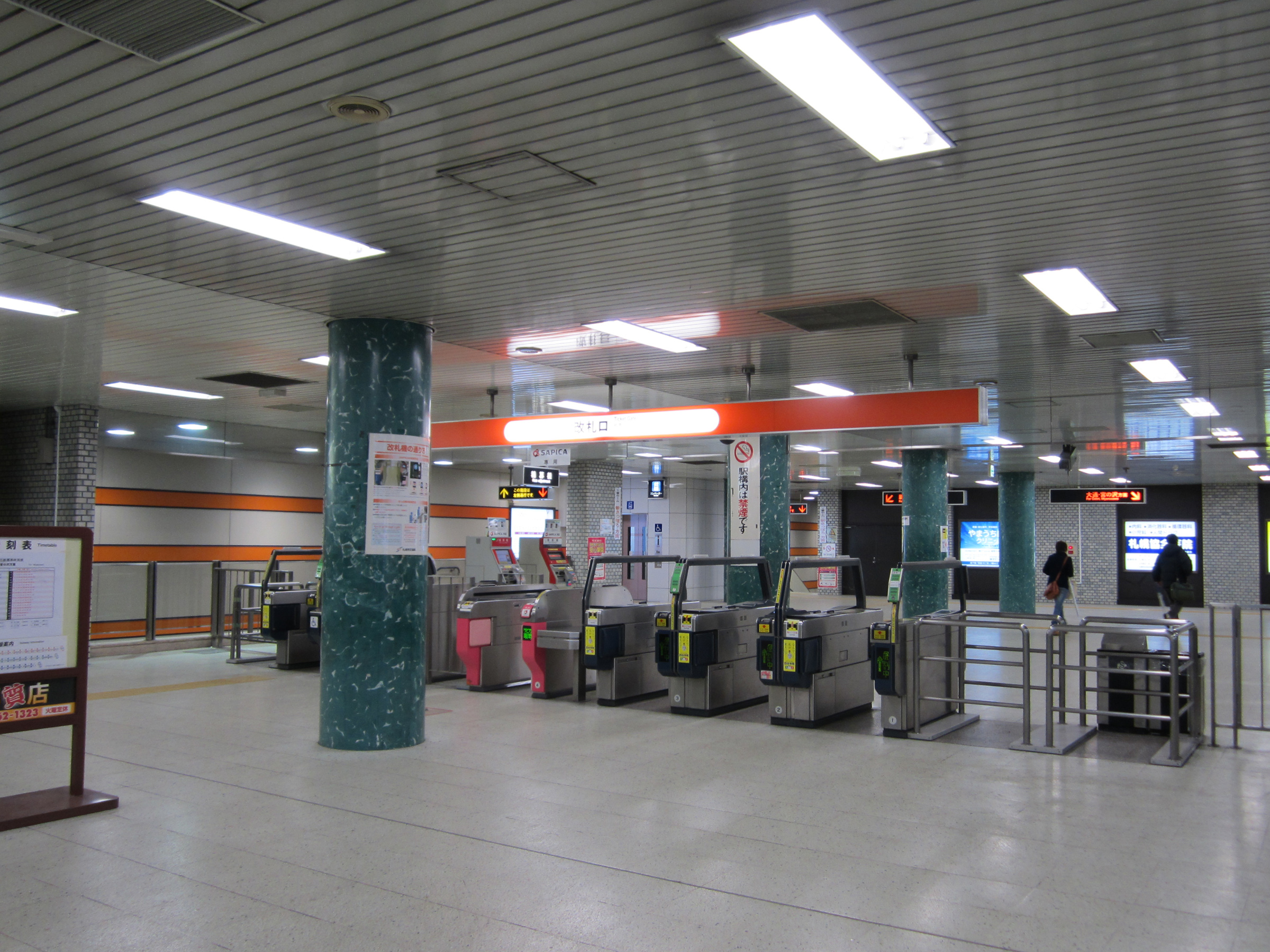
- Station ticket gate

General information
- Location: Shiroishi, Sapporo, Hokkaido; Japan
- System: Sapporo Municipal Subway station
- Operator: Sapporo City Transportation Bureau
- Line: Tōzai Line

Construction
- Accessible: Yes

Other information
- Station code: T16

History
- Opened: March 21, 1982; 44 years ago

Services
Preceding station	Sapporo Municipal Subway	Following station
Nangō-Jūsan-Chōme T15 towards Miyanosawa	Tōzai Line	Ōyachi T17 towards Shin-Sapporo
Location
- Location within Hokkaido Location within Japan

Nangō-Jūhatchōme Station (南郷18丁目駅) is a Sapporo Municipal Subway station in Shiroishi-ku, Sapporo, Hokkaido, Japan. The station number is T16.

== Platforms ==
1	■ Tōzai Line	for Shin-Sapporo
2	■ Tōzai Line	for Miyanosawa

== History ==
The station opened on 21 March 1982 coinciding with the opening of the Tozai Line extension from Shiroishi Station to Shin-Sapporo Station.

== Surrounding area ==
- Japan National Route 12 (to Asahikawa)
