= Sapporo Convention Center =

Convention center located in Japan

Sapporo Convention Center SORA
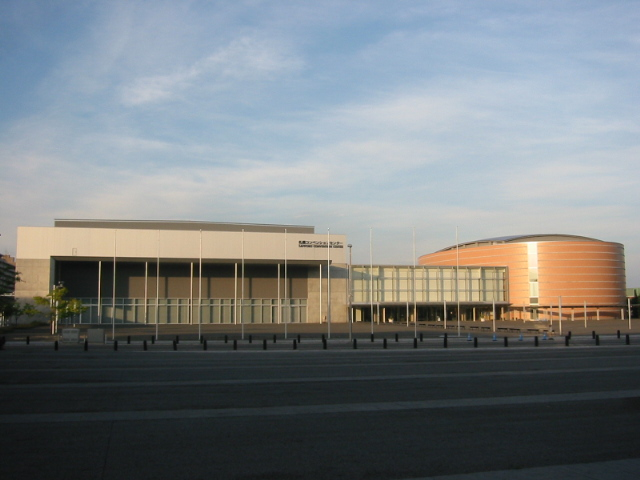
- Interactive map of Sapporo Convention Center; SORA
- Address: 1-1-1 Higashi-Sapporo 6-jo
- Location: Shiroishi-ku, Sapporo, Hokkaido
- Coordinates: 43°03′25″N 141°23′18″E

Construction
- Opened: 2003

Website
- Official site

Sapporo Convention Center (札幌流通総合会館) also known as SORA, is a convention center located in Shiroishi-ku, Sapporo, Hokkaido, Japan.

== Overview ==
Opened in June 2003, this multipurpose convention center comprehends the Main Hall: with an area of 2,607 m^{2} (capacity of 2,500 seats), the Conference Hall, the Medium Hall, the Small Hall, and 15 meeting-rooms on two floors. The total land area of the center is approximately 20,300 m^{2}.

The Hokkaido University entrance ceremony has been held in the Main Hall of the Center since 2004. It is also used as a venue for Professional Wrestling (Puroresu).

== Access ==
- Tōzai Line: 8 minutes walk from Higashi-Sapporo Station.
