= Nangō-Nana-Chōme Station =

Subway station in Sapporo, Japan

Coordinates: 43°2′24.084″N 141°24′41.570″E

T14 Nangō-Nana-Chōme Station 南郷7丁目駅
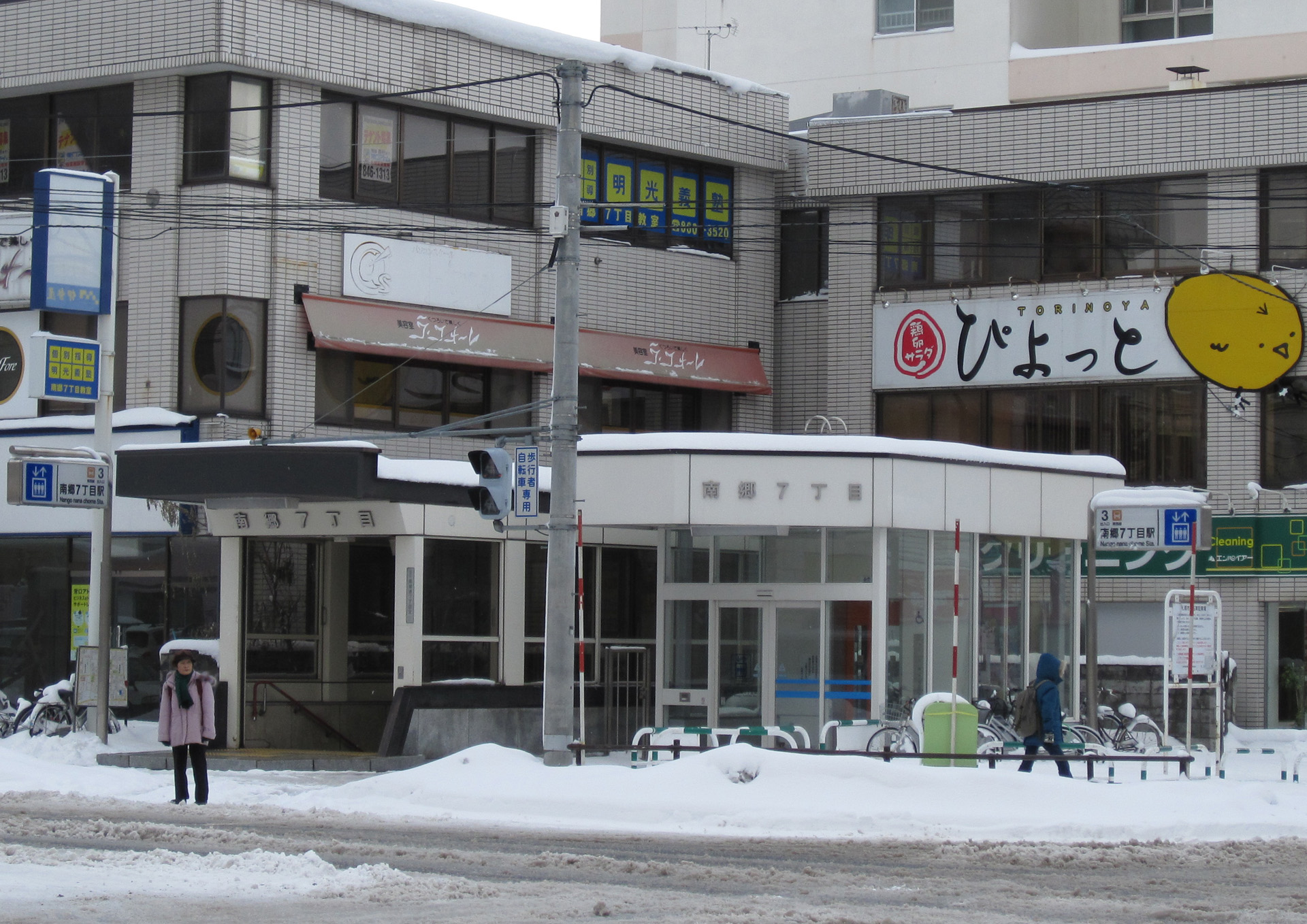
- Station exit

General information
- Location: Shiroishi, Sapporo, Hokkaido; Japan
- System: Sapporo Municipal Subway station
- Operator: Sapporo City Transportation Bureau
- Line: Tōzai Line
- Platforms: 4 (2 island platforms)
- Tracks: 3 (2 used in regular service)

Construction
- Accessible: Yes

Other information
- Station code: T14

History
- Opened: March 21, 1982; 44 years ago

Services
Preceding station	Sapporo Municipal Subway	Following station
Shiroishi T13 towards Miyanosawa	Tōzai Line	Nangō-Jūsan-Chōme T15 towards Shin-Sapporo
Location
- Location within Hokkaido Location within Japan

Nangō-Nana-Chōme Station (南郷7丁目駅) is a Sapporo Municipal Subway station in Shiroishi-ku, Sapporo, Hokkaido, Japan. The station number is T14.

== Platforms ==
1	■ Tōzai Line	for Shin-Sapporo
3	■ Tōzai Line	No regular service

4	■ Tōzai Line	for Miyanosawa (starting at Nangō-Nana-Chōme)
2	■ Tōzai Line	for Miyanosawa (from Shin-Sapporo)

== History ==
The station opened on 21 March 1982 coinciding with the opening of the Tozai Line extension from Shiroishi Station to Shin-Sapporo Station.
