= Hassamu-Minami Station =

Subway station in Sapporo, Japan

Coordinates: 43°4′55.419″N 141°17′21.71″E

T02 Hassamu-Minami Station 発寒南駅
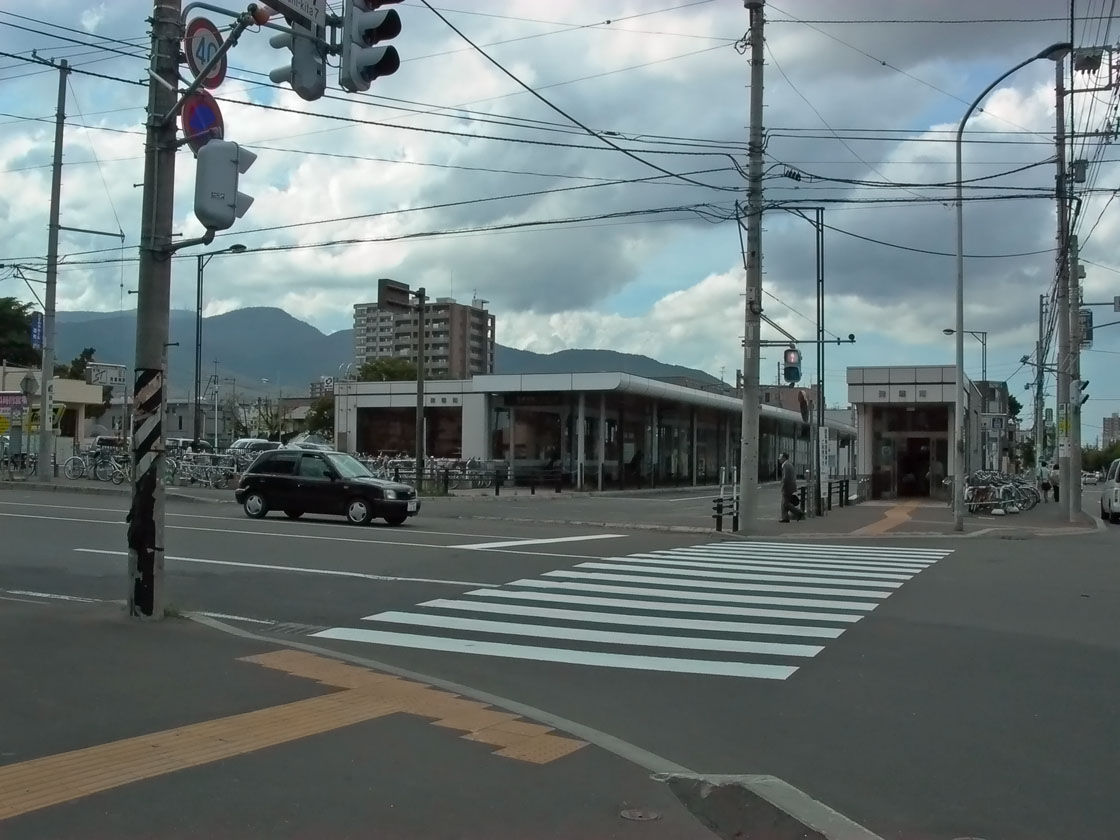
- Station exit

General information
- Location: Nishi, Sapporo, Hokkaido; Japan
- System: Sapporo Municipal Subway station
- Operator: Sapporo City Transportation Bureau
- Line: Tōzai Line

Construction
- Structure type: Underground
- Accessible: Yes

Other information
- Station code: T02

History
- Opened: February 25, 1999; 27 years ago

Services
Preceding station	Sapporo Municipal Subway	Following station
Miyanosawa T01 Terminus	Tōzai Line	Kotoni T03 towards Shin-Sapporo
Location
- Location within Hokkaido Location within Japan

Hassamu-Minami Station (発寒南駅) is a Sapporo Municipal Subway station in Nishi-ku, Sapporo, Hokkaido, Japan. The station number is T02.

== Platforms ==
1	■ Tōzai Line	for Shin-Sapporo
2	■ Tōzai Line	for Miyanosawa

== History ==
The station opened on 25 February 1999 coinciding with the opening of the Tozai Line extension from Kotoni Station to Miyanosawa Station.

== Surrounding area ==
- Hassamu-Chūō Station, JR Hokkaido
- Hassamu-Minami city bus terminal
- Nishimachi-west Police station
- Sapporo-Kita Post Office
- Maxvalu supermarket, Express Hassamu-Minami station store
- Seiyu Supermarket, West branch
- Sapporo City Agricultural Cooperative Association (JA Sapporo), West branch
- North Pacific Bank, West Branch
- Sapporo Shinkin Bank, Tsukisamu branch
- Rumoi Shinkin Bank, Sapporo Branch

== Gallery ==
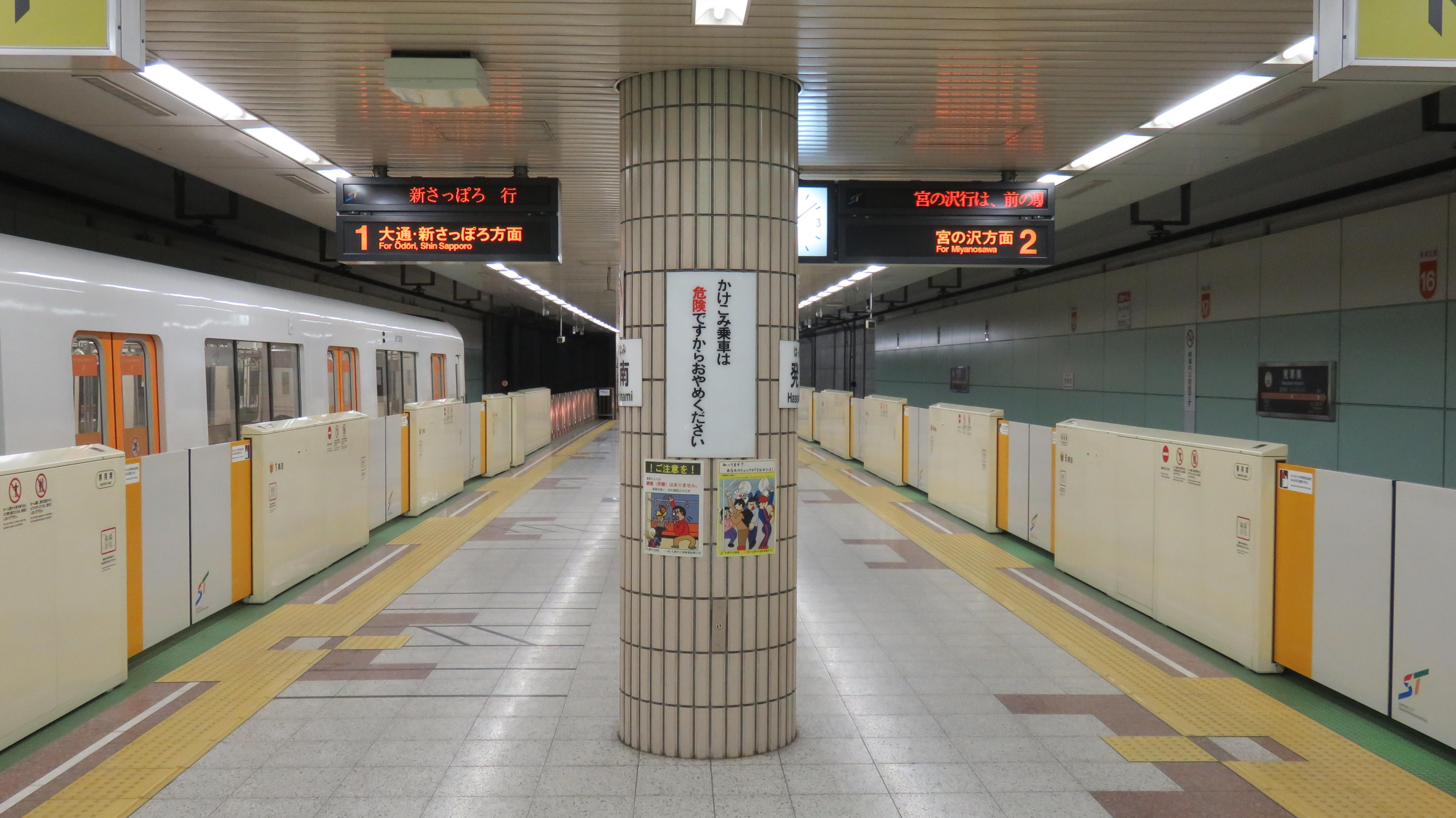
Platforms 1 and 2

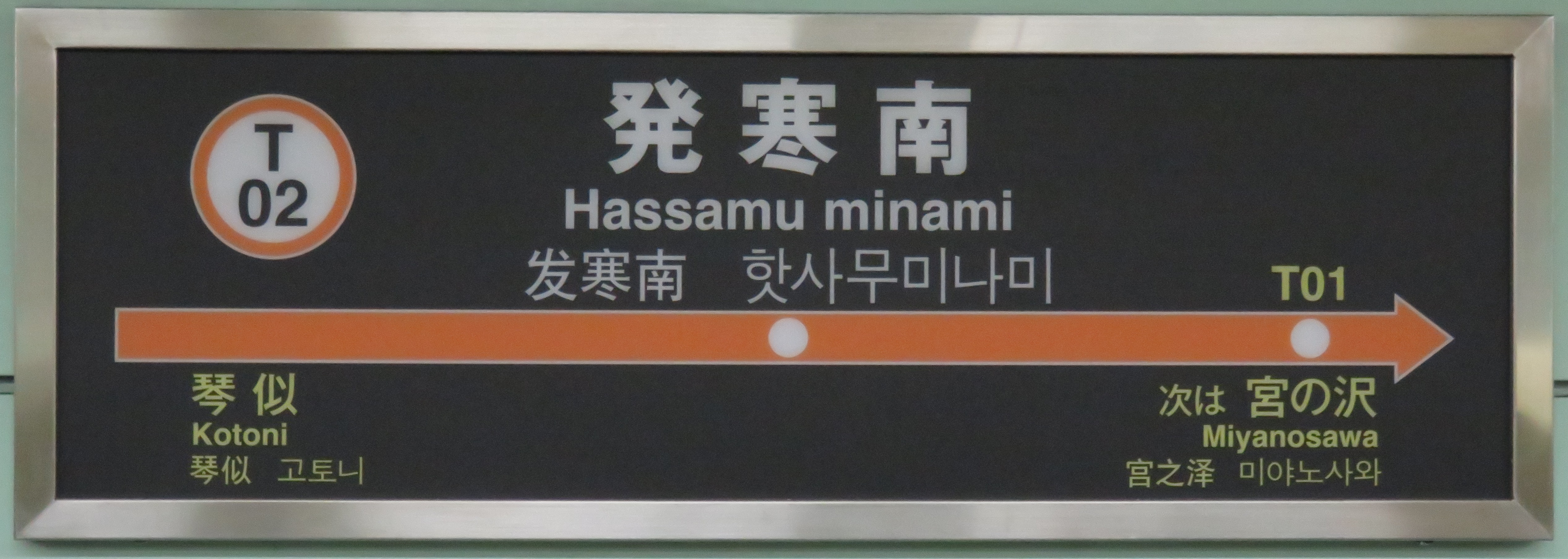
Station signboard
