= Nishi-ku, Sapporo =

Coordinates: 43°4′28″N 141°18′3″E

Nishi 西区
- Ward
- Nishi Ward
- Flag Seal

- Location of Nishi-ku in Sapporo
- Country: Japan
- Prefecture: Hokkaidō
- City: Sapporo
- Established: April 1, 1972

Area
  - Total: 75.10 km^{2} (29.00 sq mi)

Population (2021)
  - Total: 218,402
  - Density: 2,908/km^{2} (7,532/sq mi)
- Estimation as of August 31, 2021
- Time zone: UTC+9 (Japan Standard Time)
- Postal: 063-8612
- Address: 7-1-1 Mokotonijo, Nishi-ku, Sapporo-shi, Hokkaido
- Website: Nishi-ku Ward Office

Nishi (西区; -ku, lit. "west ward") is a ward of Sapporo composed of residential neighborhoods mostly arranged in grid patterns, with some areas of farmland and forested mountainous terrain mostly near its western and southern edges. It is located the west part of Sapporo city and the second largest of Sapporo's 10 wards. Neighbourhoods within Nishi-ku include Kotoni (琴似), Hachiken (八軒), Nijuyonken (二十四軒), Yamanote (山の手), Nishimachi (西町), Nishino (西野), Fukui (福井), Heiwa (平和), Hassamu (発寒), Miyanosawa (宮の沢), and Kobetsuzawa (小別沢).

== Outline ==
The administrative offices of Nishi-ku are located in the Kotoni neighbourhood.

Nishi-ku is the oldest area in a history of urban development in Sapporo. Sapporo Municipal Teine Memorial Museum (手稲記念館), Kotoni Tonden Historical Archives (琴似屯田歴史館資料室), and Mitobe Memorial Museum (三戸部記念館) are sites of historical interest whose focus is on the era of Japanese 'pioneers' in Hokkaidō.

== Geography ==
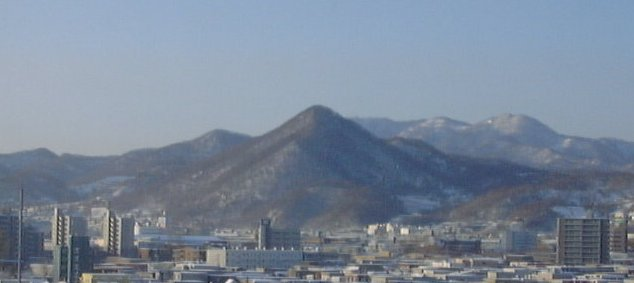
Sankaku-yama in winter

The eastern part of Nishi-Ku is flat with many residential and commercial areas, but the western part slopes into mountains. Sankaku-yama, located in the western part of the ward in the Yamanote area, is a 311.3m high triangle-shaped mountain and is a popular and easy hike. It leads to Okura jump stadium in Chuo-ku.

Hokkaido Consadole Sapporo's practice field is also located in Nishi-ku, and is a popular site for the team's fans. Major parks in Nishi-ku are Noshi Koen and Miyagaoka Koen. Numerous other parks may be found, many located along the banks of the Kotoni-Hassamu-gawa and its tributaries. Hiking trails abound. One of the most popular begins from near the Heiwa-no-taki waterfall and leads to the summit of Sapporo's famous mountain, Mt. Teine in which the Olympic game was held in 1972 has some ski ground and an amusement park, located on the division line of Nishi-ku and Teine-ku, the city's northwesternmost ward.

In the less built-up neighbourhoods of Nishino, Heiwa, Fukui, and Kobetsuzawa, it is not unusual for wildlife, such as red foxes and Asiatic brown bears to be observed.

== Transportation ==
Primary public transportation services are the Sapporo Municipal Subway, JR Hokkaidō, and bus services including JR Hokkaidō Bus and Hokkaidō Chūō Bus. The last four stations of the Tozai subway line's western end are located here, two of which were added in 1999. Japan Highway's Sapporo-Otaru expressway section passes through Nishi-ku.

=== Rail ===
- JR Hokkaido
  - Hakodate Main Line: Hassamu - Hassamu-Chūō - Kotoni
  - Sasshō Line: Hachiken Station
- Sapporo Municipal Subway
  - Tōzai Line: Miyanosawa - Hassamu-Minami - Kotoni - Nijūyon-Ken

=== Road ===
- Sasson: Sapporo-nishi IC
- Route 5

== Education ==
=== High schools ===
==== Public ====
- Hokkaido Sapporo Seiryou High School
- Hokkaido Sapporo Kotoni Technical High School

==== Private ====
- Sapporo Yamanote High School

== Mascot ==
Sankaku Yamabe, the ward's mascot

Nishi's mascot is Yamabe Sankaku (さんかく やまベェ) is a mountain yōkai. He was discovered in Kamisunagawa in 1959. He is said to inhabit Mount Sankakuyama and Kotonihassamu River. It is believed that he is 1.5 million years old. He loves to eat mountain apples and komatsuna spinaches from the river. As he is a lover of nature, he is saving the world from global warming. He is designed by Yuji Motoaki and became mascot in 2007. He is not the only yōkai of his type, there are three others.

- Nibe (にーべェ) is a Chinese yaoguai who studies martial arts like kenpo. She helps Yamabe fight pollution.
- Maruyamabe (まるやまベェ) is a mountain yōkai who is scholar. He lives in Maruyama and loves studying.
- Warube (わるべェ) is a yōkai who studies economics. He can expel hot air and environmental pollutants whenever carbon dioxide rises.
