= Shiroishi-ku =

Shiroishi 白石区
- Ward
- Shiroishi Ward
- Flag Seal

- Location of Shiroishi-ku in Sapporo

- Coordinates: 43°02′52″N 141°24′18″E
- Country: Japan
- Region: Hokkaidō
- Prefecture: Ishikari
- City: Sapporo
- Established: April 1, 1972

Government
  - Mayor: Yoichi Horiuchi

Area
  - Total: 34.47 km^{2} (13.31 sq mi)

Population (August 31, 2021)
  - Total: 213,704
  - Density: 6,200/km^{2} (16,060/sq mi)
- Time zone: UTC+9 (Japan Standard Time)
- Tree: Poplar
- Flower: Rose
- Telephone: 011-862-2400
- Address: 3-Kita-1-1 Hongo-dori, Shiroishi-ku, Sapporo-shi, Hokkaido 003-8612

Shiroishi-ku (白石区) is one of the ten wards in Sapporo, Hokkaido, Japan. As of August 31, 2021, the ward has a population of 213,704.

== History ==
- 1871: Shiroishi village was founded.
- 1873: Kamishiroishi village split off from Shiroishi village.
- 1902: Shiroishi village and kamishiroishi village were merged to form Shiroishi village.
- 1950: Shiroishi village was merged into Sapporo city.
- 1972: Sapporo was designated as one of the cities designated by government ordinance and Shiroishi-ku was established.
- 1989: Atsubetsu-ku split off from Shiroishi-ku.

== Transportation ==
=== Rail ===
- JR Hokkaido
  - Hakodate Main Line: Shiroishi Station
  - Chitose Line: Shiroishi - Heiwa
- Sapporo Municipal Subway
  - Tōzai Line: Kikusui - Higashi-Sapporo - Shiroishi - Nangō-Nana-Chōme - Nangō-Jūsan-Chōme - Nangō-Jūhatchōme

=== Road ===
- Hokkaido Expressway: Sapporo IC - Kitago IC - Oyachi IC
- Route 12
- Route 274
- Route 275

== Education ==
=== High schools ===
==== Public ====
- Hokkaido Sapporo Higashi High School
- Hokkaido Sapporo Shiroishi High School
- Hokkaido Sapporo Hakuryo High School

==== Private ====
- Clark Memorial International High School, Sapporo Shiroishi Campus

== Mascots ==
Shiroppy and Kuroppy, the ward's mascots

Shiroishi's mascots are Shiroppy (しろっぴー) and Kuroppy (くろっぴー). They are cute snowmen with rose motifs.

- Shiroppy is a white active snowwoman who wears a red rose hat and cares about people. She was unveiled in July 2008.
- Kuroppy is a grey selfish snowwoman who wears a blue rose hat and loves to bother people for fun. She is the rival of Shiroppy. She was unveiled in February 2020.

== Friendship city ==
- Shiroishi, Miyagi
