= Tōzai Line (Sapporo) =

Rubber-tyred rail line in Sapporo, Japan

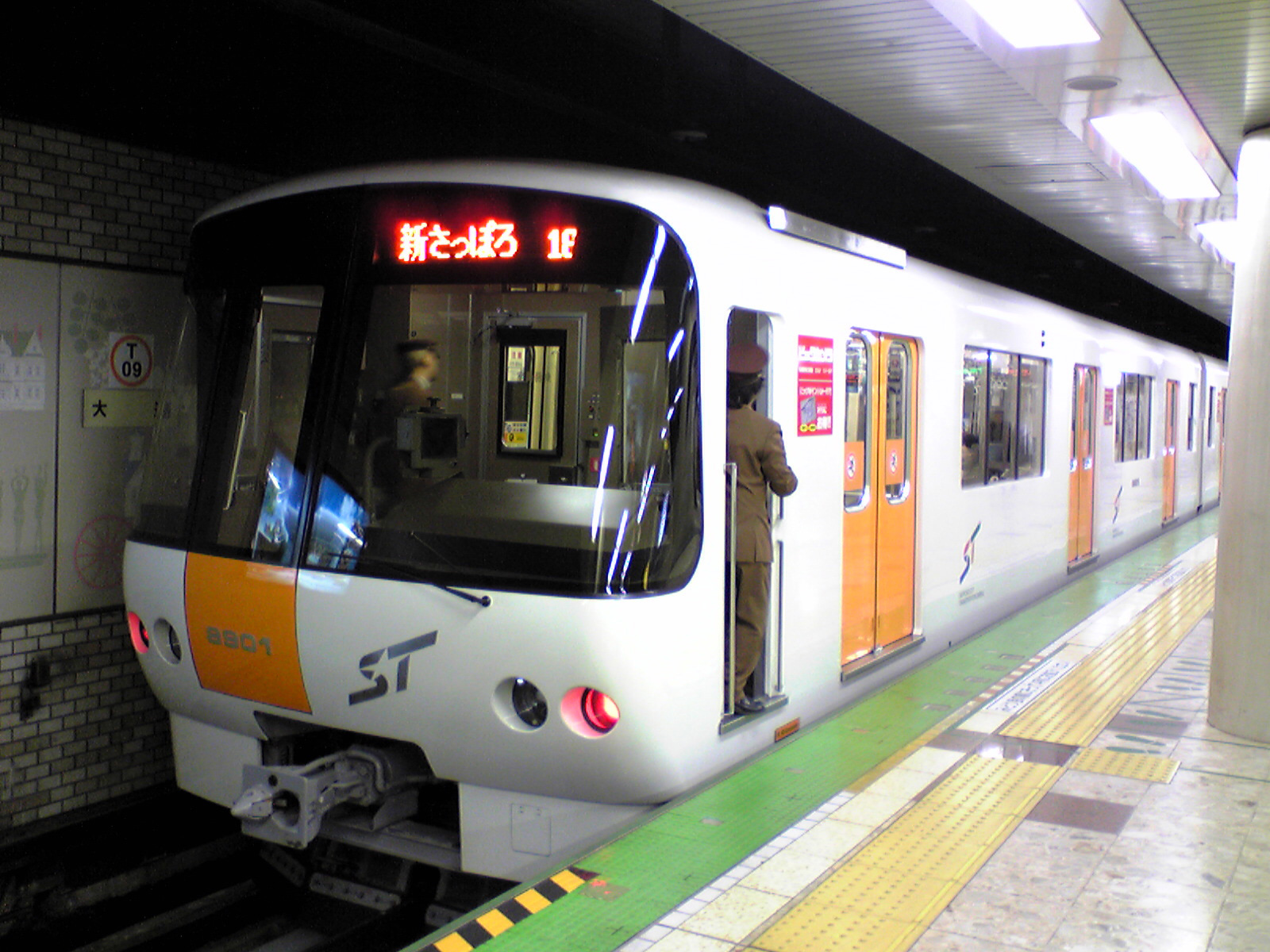
- 8000 series EMU at Ōdōri Station

Overview
- Owner: Sapporo City Transportation Bureau
- Locale: Sapporo, Hokkaido
- Termini: Miyanosawa; Shin-Sapporo
- Stations: 19
- Color on map: Orange

Service
- Type: Rubber-tyred metro
- System: Sapporo Municipal Subway
- Rolling stock: 8000 series EMUs
- Daily ridership: 237,500 (2023 estimate)

History
- Opened: 10 June 1976; 50 years ago
- Last extension: 25 February 1999; 27 years ago

Technical
- Line length: 20.1 km (12.5 mi)
- Number of tracks: Double-tracked
- Track gauge: Central guideway with rubber tires
- Electrification: 1,500 V DC overhead catenary
- Operating speed: 70 km/h (43 mph) (Maximum)
- Signalling: Cab signalling
- Train protection system: ATC, ATO

The Tōzai Line (東西線, Tōzai-sen; lit. 'East-West Line') is a rubber-tyred metro line of the Sapporo Municipal Subway, serving Sapporo, Hokkaido, Japan. It runs from Miyanosawa Station in Nishi-ku to Shin-Sapporo Station in Atsubetsu-ku, with 19 stations. Its map color is orange, and its station designations use the Latin letter T (initial of Tōzai) followed by two digits.

== Station list ==
- All stations are located in Sapporo.
- The entire line is underground.

| No. | Station name | Japanese | Distance (km) | | Transfers | Location |
| No. | Station name | Japanese | Between stations | Total | Transfers | Location |
|---|---|---|---|---|---|---|
| T01 | Miyanosawa | 宮の沢 | - | 0.0 | | Nishi-ku |
| T02 | Hassamu-Minami | 発寒南 | 1.5 | 1.5 | | Nishi-ku |
| T03 | Kotoni | 琴似 | 1.3 | 2.8 | | Nishi-ku |
| T04 | Nijūyon-Ken | 二十四軒 | 0.9 | 3.7 | | Nishi-ku |
| T05 | Nishi-Nijūhatchōme | 西28丁目 | 1.2 | 4.9 | | Chūō-ku |
| T06 | Maruyama-Kōen | 円山公園 | 0.8 | 5.7 | | Chūō-ku |
| T07 | Nishi-Jūhatchōme | 西18丁目 | 0.9 | 6.6 | Sapporo Streetcar (Nishi-Jūgo-Chōme) | Chūō-ku |
| T08 | Nishi-Jūitchōme | 西11丁目 | 0.9 | 7.5 | Sapporo Streetcar (Chūō-Kuyakusho-Mae) | Chūō-ku |
| T09 | Ōdōri | 大通 | 1.0 | 8.5 | Namboku Line ( N07 ) Tōhō Line( H08 ) Sapporo Streetcar (Nishi-Yon-Chōme) | Chūō-ku |
| T10 | Bus Center-Mae | バスセンター前 | 0.8 | 9.3 | | Chūō-ku |
| T11 | Kikusui | 菊水 | 1.1 | 10.4 | | Shiroishi-ku |
| T12 | Higashi-Sapporo | 東札幌 | 1.2 | 11.6 | | Shiroishi-ku |
| T13 | Shiroishi | 白石 | 1.1 | 12.7 | | Shiroishi-ku |
| T14 | Nangō-Nana-Chōme | 南郷7丁目 | 1.4 | 14.1 | | Shiroishi-ku |
| T15 | Nangō-Jūsan-Chōme | 南郷13丁目 | 1.1 | 15.2 | | Shiroishi-ku |
| T16 | Nangō-Jūhatchōme | 南郷18丁目 | 1.2 | 16.4 | | Shiroishi-ku |
| T17 | Ōyachi | 大谷地 | 1.5 | 17.9 | | Atsubetsu-ku |
| T18 | Hibarigaoka | ひばりが丘 | 1.0 | 18.9 | | Atsubetsu-ku |
| T19 | Shin-Sapporo | 新さっぽろ | 1.2 | 20.1 | Chitose Line ( H05 ) | Atsubetsu-ku |

== History ==
- 10 June 1976: Kotoni – Shiroishi section opens; 6000 series trains debut.
- 21 March 1982: Shiroishi – Shin-Sapporo section opens.
- 22 March 1987: Nishi-Jūitchōme – Ōdōri section closed due to construction of connecting track to Tōhō Line
- 18 August 1998: 8000 series trains debut.
- 25 February 1999: Kotoni – Miyanosawa section opens.
- 2002: 6000 series trains begin to be replaced by 8000 series trains.
- 7 July 2006: 8000 series trains optimized for driver-only operation debut.
- 13 February 2008: Platform edge doors installed at Nangō-Nana-Chōme Station for testing prior to line-wide deployment
- 30 August 2008: Last 6000 series trains are taken out of service.
- 30 January 2009: SAPICA contactless smart card introduced.
- 3 March 2009: Platform edge doors installed at all Tōzai Line stations.
- 1 April 2009: Tōzai Line switches to wanman driver-only operation.
- 13 July 2009: "Women and Children Comfort Cars" introduced.
- 2023: Line reports 219,400 daily riders, roughly 99% of 2019 totals
