= Kotoni Station (Sapporo Municipal Subway) =

Subway station in Sapporo, Japan

Coordinates: 43°4′32.858″N 141°18′13.86″E

T03 Kotoni Station 琴似駅
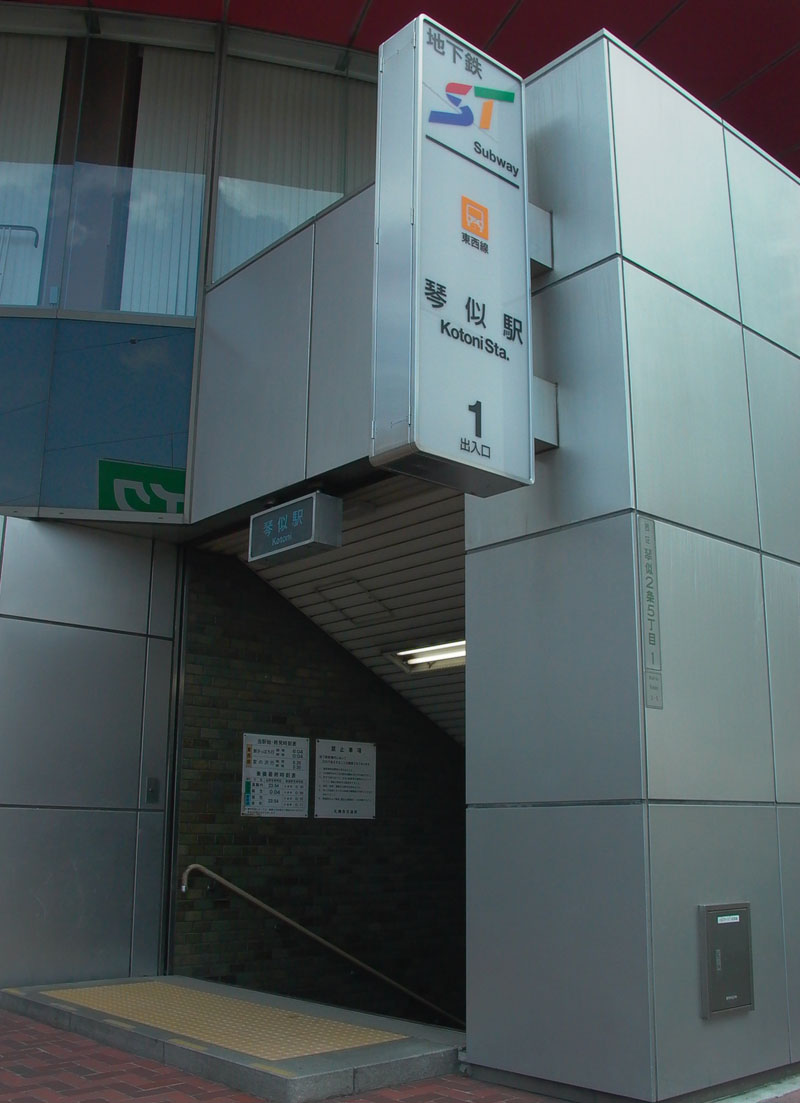
- Station exit, September 2009

General information
- Location: Nishi, Sapporo, Hokkaido; Japan
- System: Sapporo Municipal Subway station
- Operator: Sapporo City Transportation Bureau
- Line: Tōzai Line

Construction
- Structure type: Underground
- Accessible: Yes

Other information
- Station code: T03

History
- Opened: 10 June 1976; 50 years ago

Services
Preceding station	Sapporo Municipal Subway	Following station
Hassamu-Minami T02 towards Miyanosawa	Tōzai Line	Nijūyon-Ken T04 towards Shin-Sapporo
Location
- Location within Hokkaido Location within Japan

Kotoni Station (琴似駅, Kotoni-eki) is a Sapporo Municipal Subway station in Nishi-ku, Sapporo, Hokkaido, Japan. It is numbered T03.

== Station layout ==
The station consists of an underground island platform serving two tracks.

=== Platforms ===
1	■ Tōzai Line	for Shin-Sapporo
2	■ Tōzai Line	for Miyanosawa

== History ==
The station opened on 10 June 1976, coinciding with the opening of the Tozai Line from this station to Shiroishi Station.

Originally the northern terminus of the Tozai Line, it was moved to Miyanosawa Station when the extension of the line opened on 25 February 1999.

== Surrounding area ==
- Kotoni Station (JR Hokkaido)
- Japan National Route 5 (to Hakodate)
- Kotoni city bus Terminal
- Sapporo Nishi Ward Office
- Kotoni Shrine
- Hondori Kotoni Police station
- Kotoni Post Office
- Sapporo Yamanote Library
- Maxvalu supermarket, Kotoni store
- ÆON Sapporo Kotoni store
- Sapporo Shinkin Bank, Kotoni branch
- Asahikawa Shinkin Bank, Kotoni branch
- North Pacific Bank, Kotoni branch
- Hokkaido Bank, Kotoni branch
- Hokuriku Bank, Kotoni branch

== Gallery ==
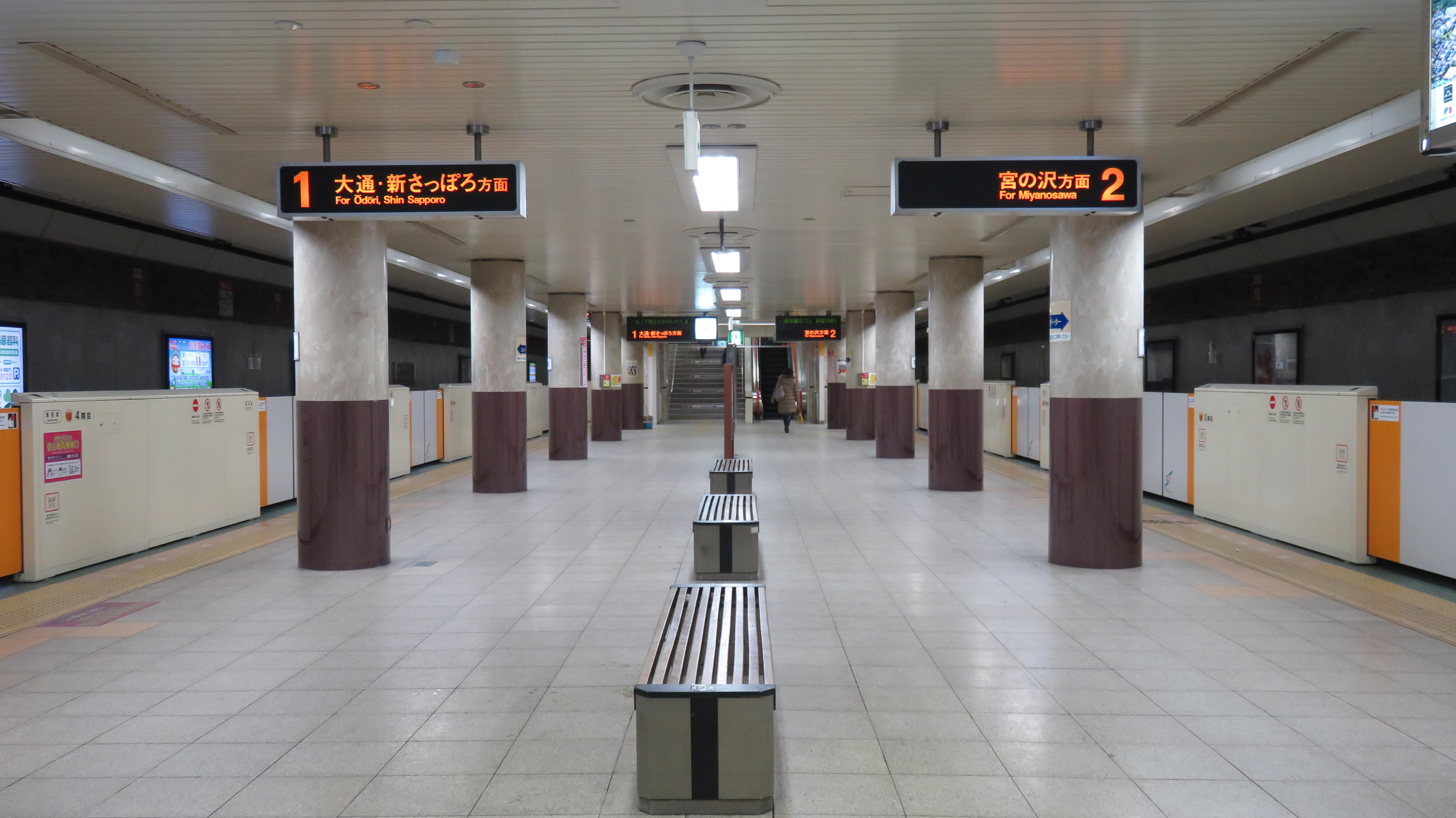
Platforms 1 and 2

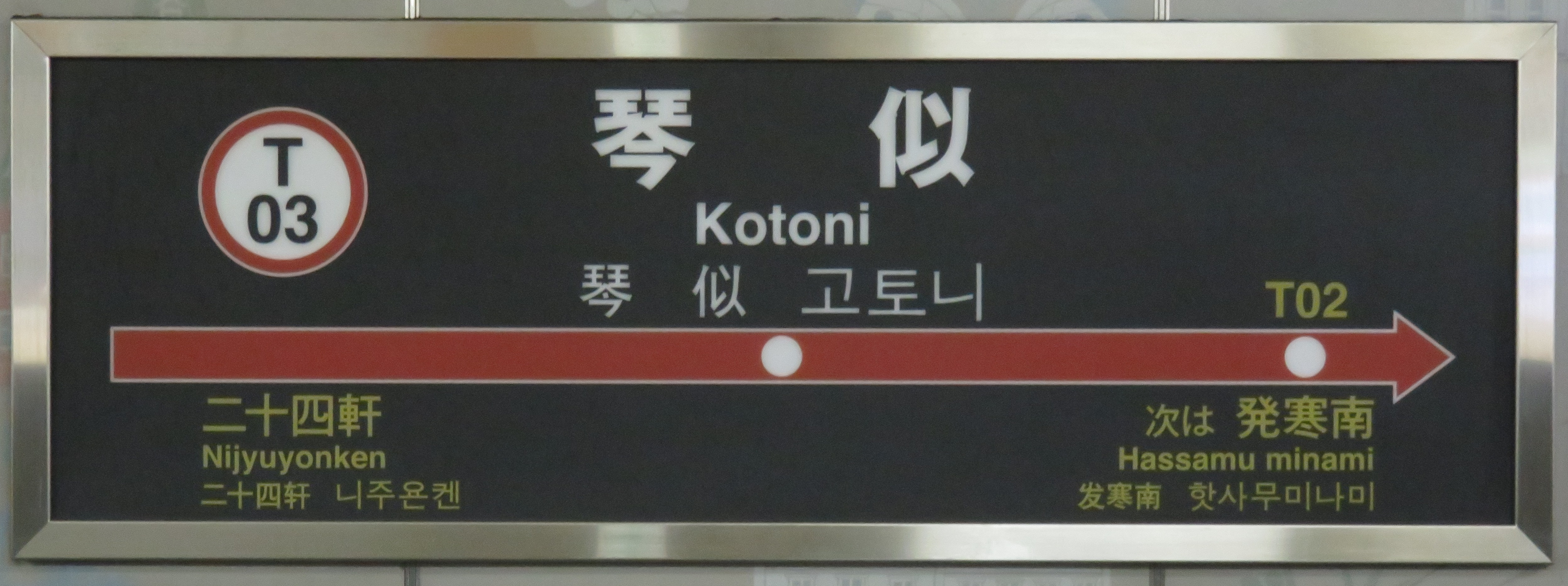
Station signboard
