= Shiroishi Station (Sapporo Municipal Subway) =

Subway station in Sapporo, Japan

Coordinates: 43°2′46.330″N 141°23′46.78″E

T13 Shiroishi Station 白石駅
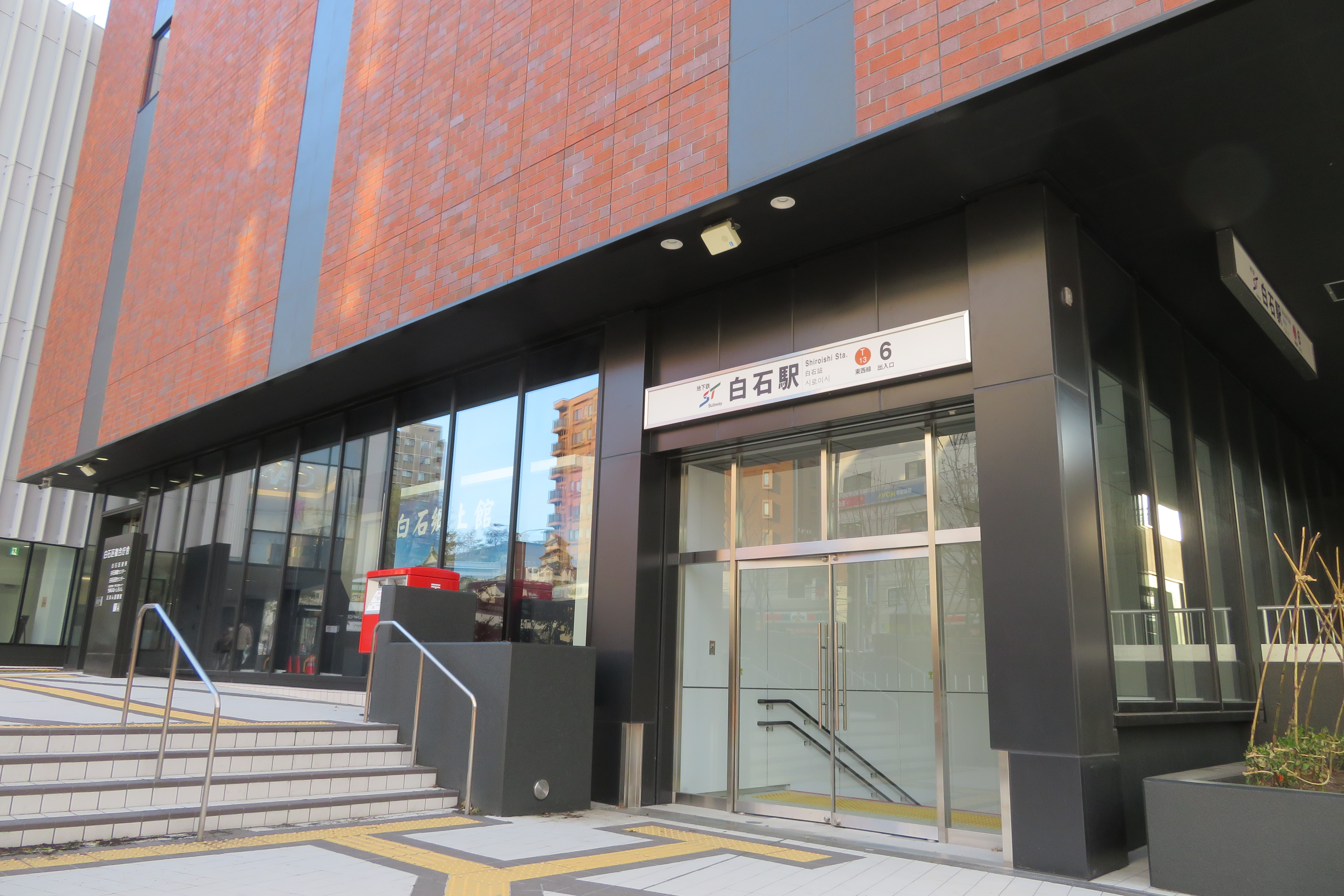
- Station entrance

General information
- Location: Shiroishi, Sapporo, Hokkaido; Japan
- System: Sapporo Municipal Subway station
- Operator: Sapporo City Transportation Bureau
- Line: Tōzai Line

Construction
- Accessible: Yes

Other information
- Station code: T13

History
- Opened: 10 June 1976; 50 years ago

Services
Preceding station	Sapporo Municipal Subway	Following station
Higashi-Sapporo T12 towards Miyanosawa	Tōzai Line	Nangō-Nana-Chōme T14 towards Shin-Sapporo
Location
- Location within Hokkaido Location within Japan

Shiroishi Station (白石駅) is a Sapporo Municipal Subway station in Shiroishi-ku, Sapporo, Hokkaido, Japan. The station number is T13.

== Platforms ==
1	■ Tōzai Line	for Shin-Sapporo
2	■ Tōzai Line	for Miyanosawa

== History ==
The station opened on 10 June 1976 coinciding with the opening of the Tozai Line from Kotoni Station to this station. At the time of opening, Shiroshi Station was the southern terminus of the Tozai Line.

When the extension of the Tozai Line opened on 21 March 1982, the southern terminus was relocated to Shin-Sapporo Station.

== Gallery ==
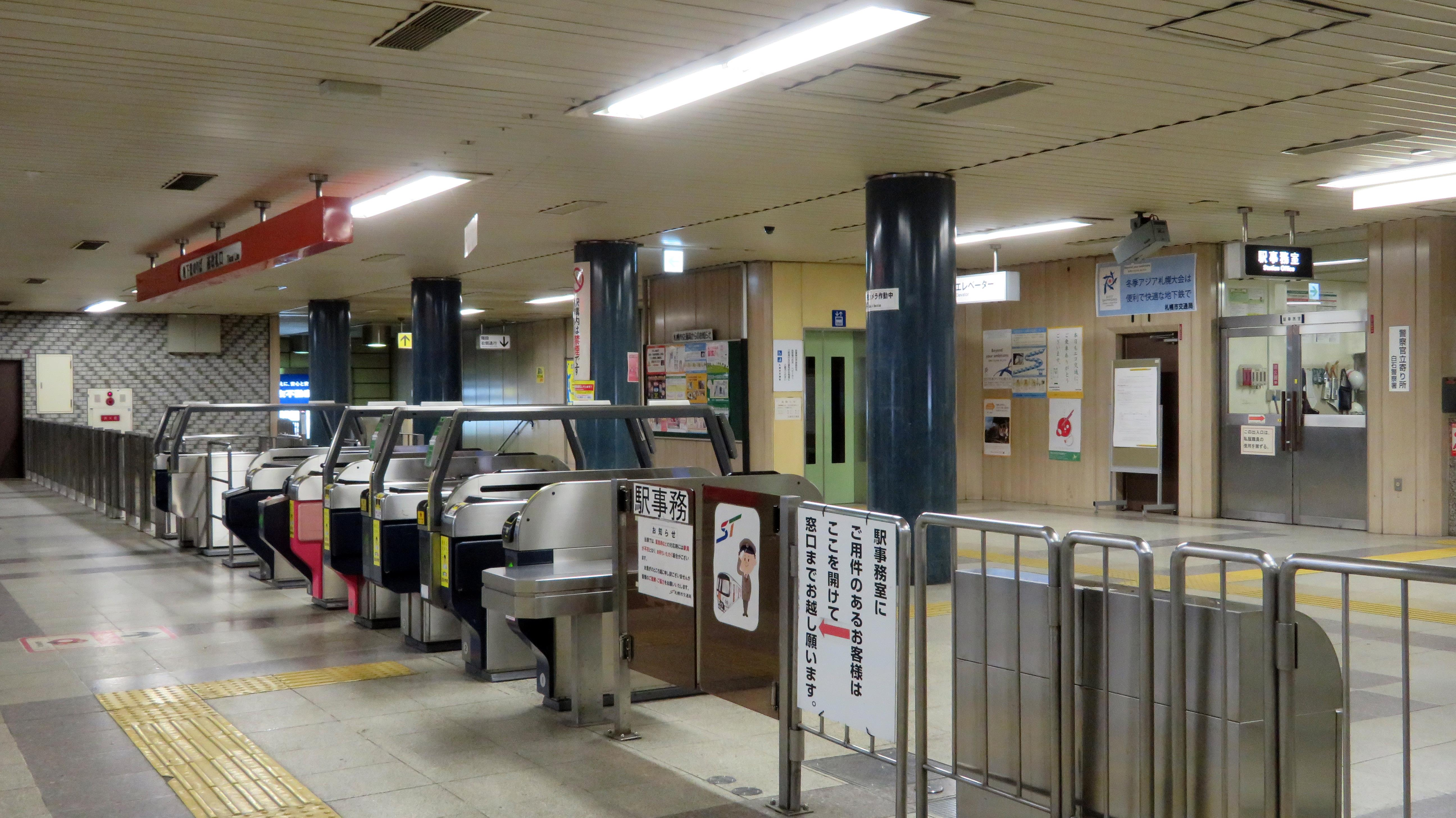
Ticket gates

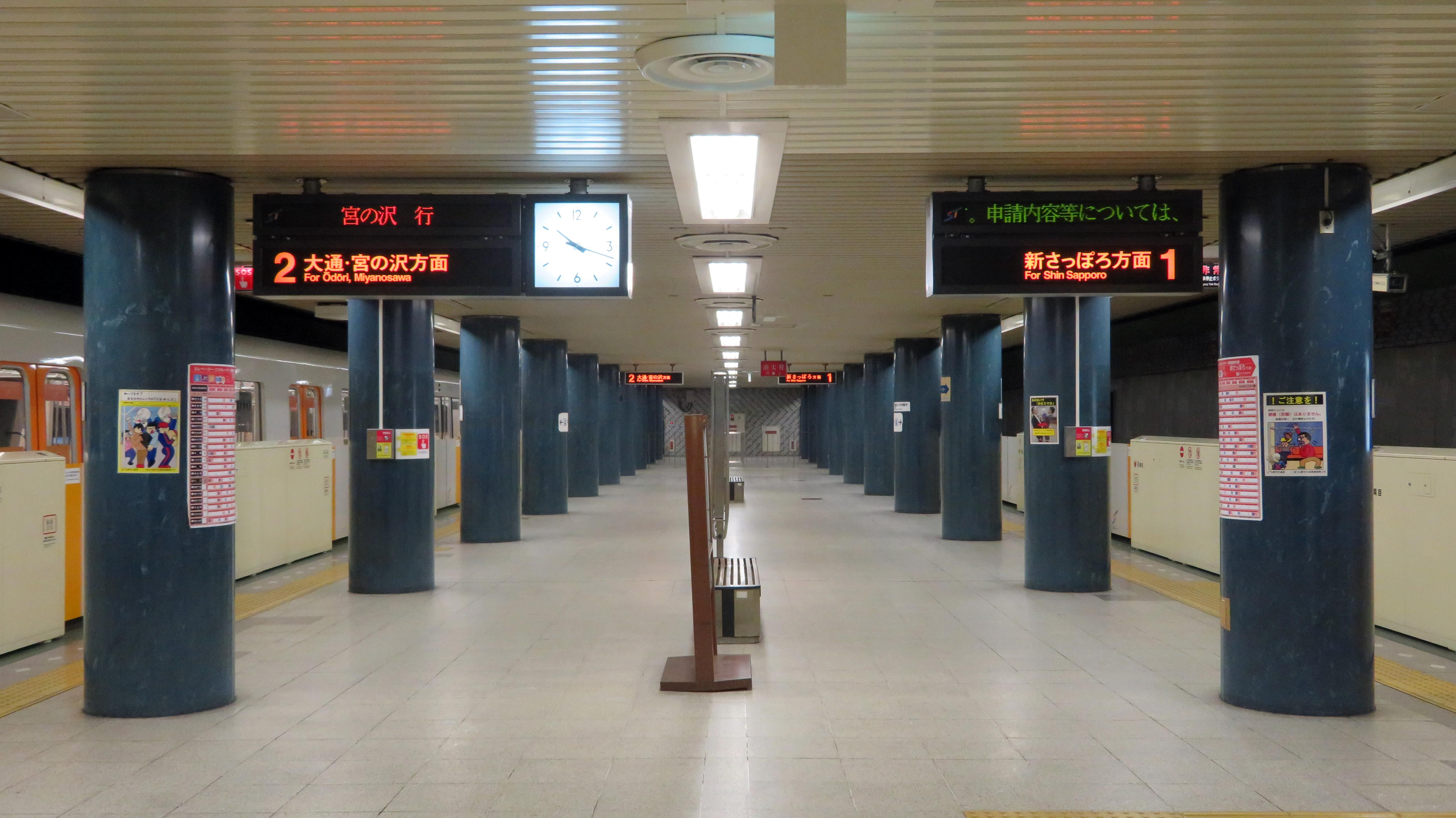
Station platform
