= Miyanosawa Station =

Subway station in Sapporo, Japan

Coordinates: 43°5′24.054″N 141°16′37.40″E

T01 Miyanosawa Station 宮の沢駅
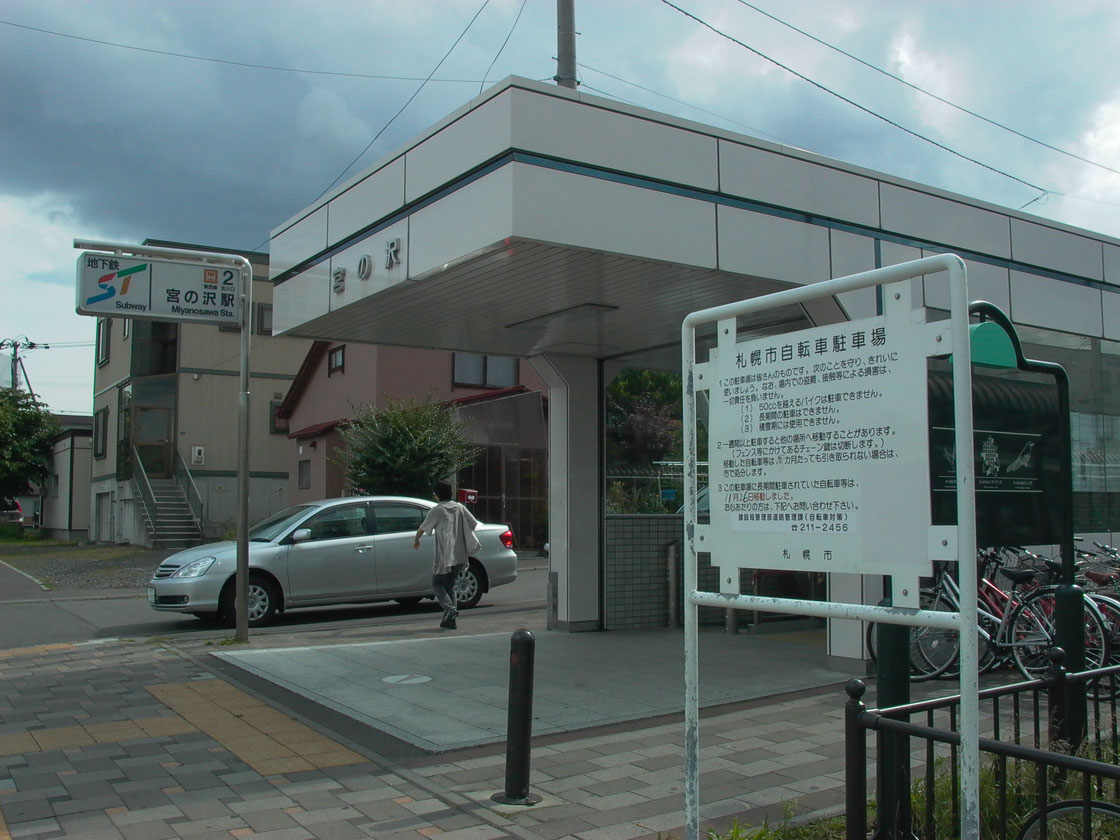
- The street level view of Exit 2.

General information
- Location: Nishi, Sapporo, Hokkaido; Japan
- System: Sapporo Municipal Subway subway
- Operator: Sapporo City Transportation Bureau
- Line: Tōzai Line
- Platforms: 2
- Connections: None

Construction
- Structure type: Underground
- Accessible: Yes

Other information
- Station code: T01

History
- Opened: 25 February 1999; 27 years ago

Services
Preceding station	Sapporo Municipal Subway	Following station
Terminus	Tōzai Line	Hassamu-Minami T02 towards Shin-Sapporo
Location
- Location within Hokkaido Location within Japan

Miyanosawa Station (宮の沢駅) is a metro station in Nishi-ku, Sapporo, Hokkaido, Japan. The station number is T01.

The station is the northern terminus of the Tōzai Line.

== Platforms ==
1	■ Tōzai Line	for Shin-Sapporo
2	■ Tōzai Line	for Shin-Sapporo

== History ==
The station opened on 25 February 1999 coinciding with the opening of the Tozai Line extension from Kotoni Station.

== Surrounding area ==
- Ishiya Chocolate Factory, Shiroi Koibito Park (via underground link near Exit 5)
- Shiroi Koibito Football Stadium
- Consadole Sapporo Store & Museum
- Miyanooka Park
- Japan National Route 5 (to Hakodate)
- Post Office Miyanosawa
- Seiyu Store, Miyanosawa
- Hokkaido Bank, Miyanosawa
- North Pacific Bank, Miyanosawa

== Gallery ==
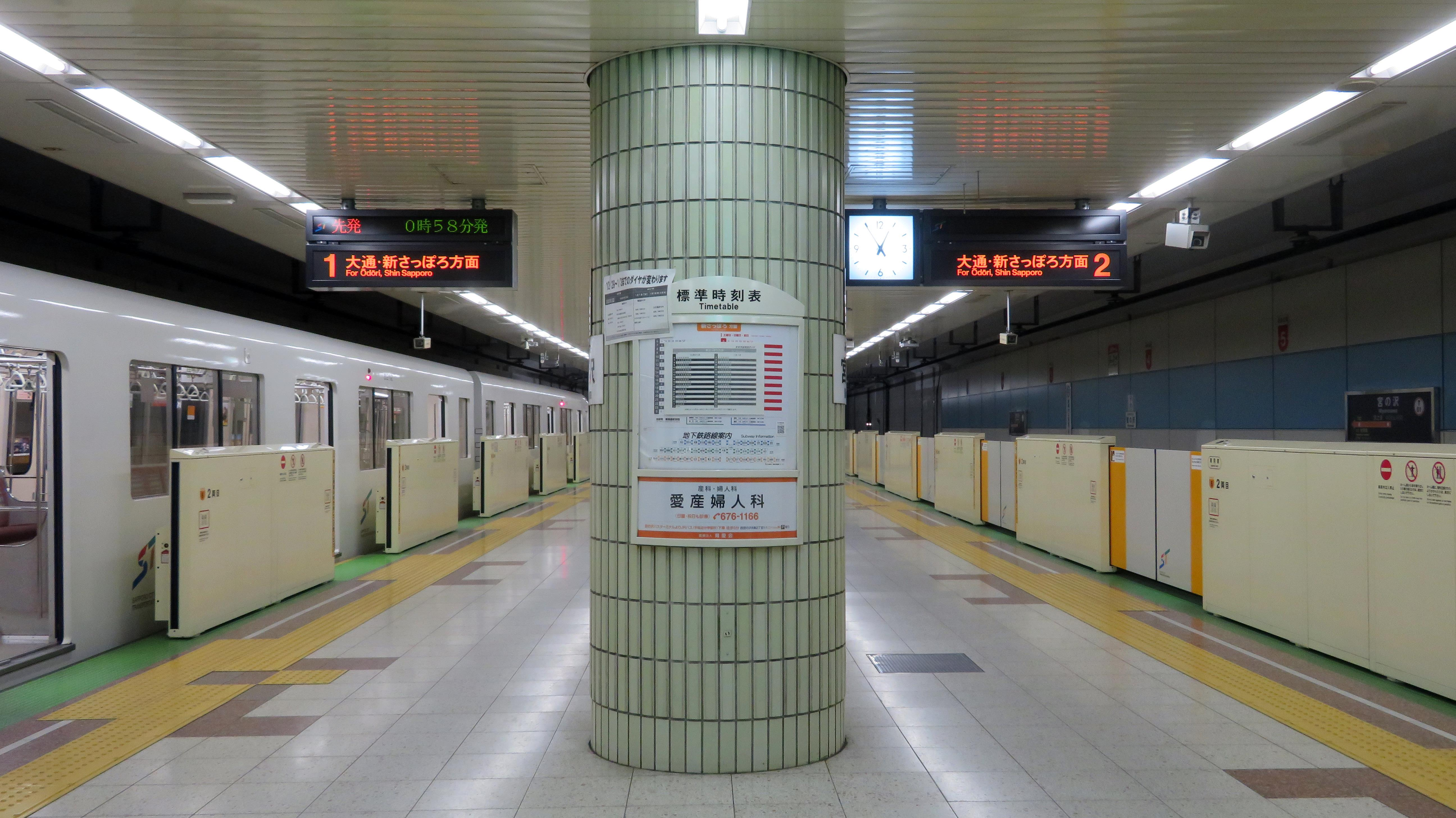
Platforms 1 and 2

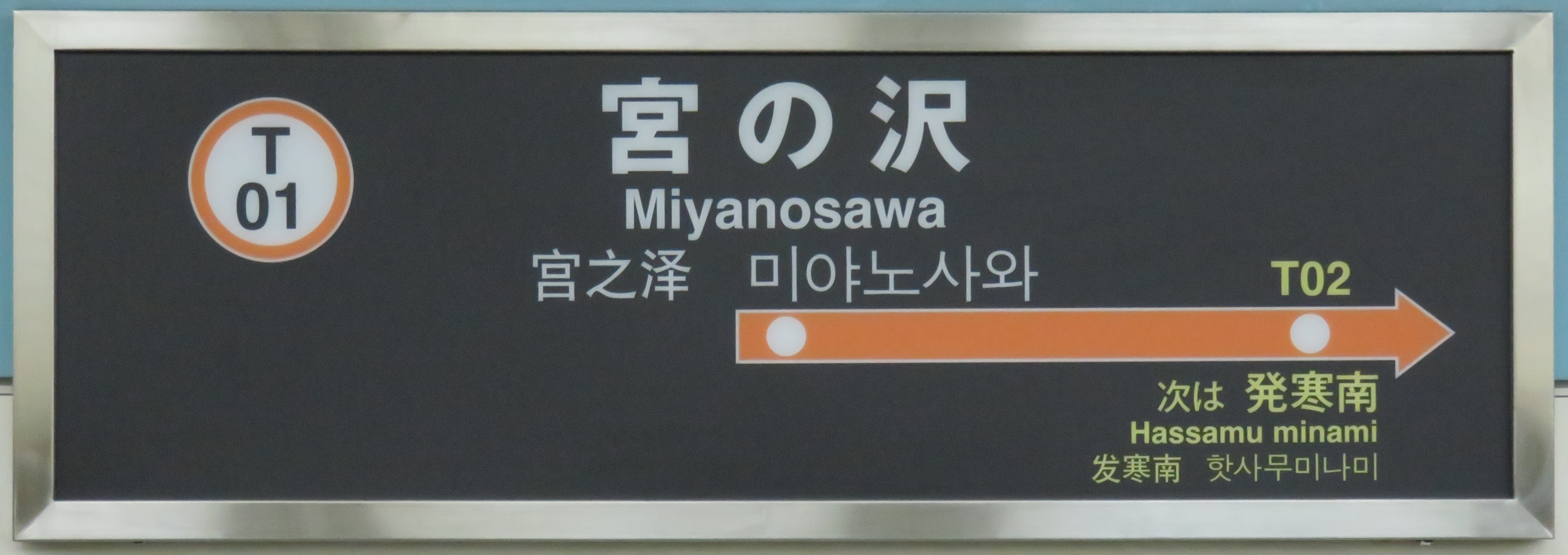
Signboard
