= Shin-Sapporo Station =

Railway and subway station in Sapporo, Japan

Coordinates: 43.0387833°N 141.4724708°E

Shin Sapporo Station 新札幌駅 新さっぽろ駅
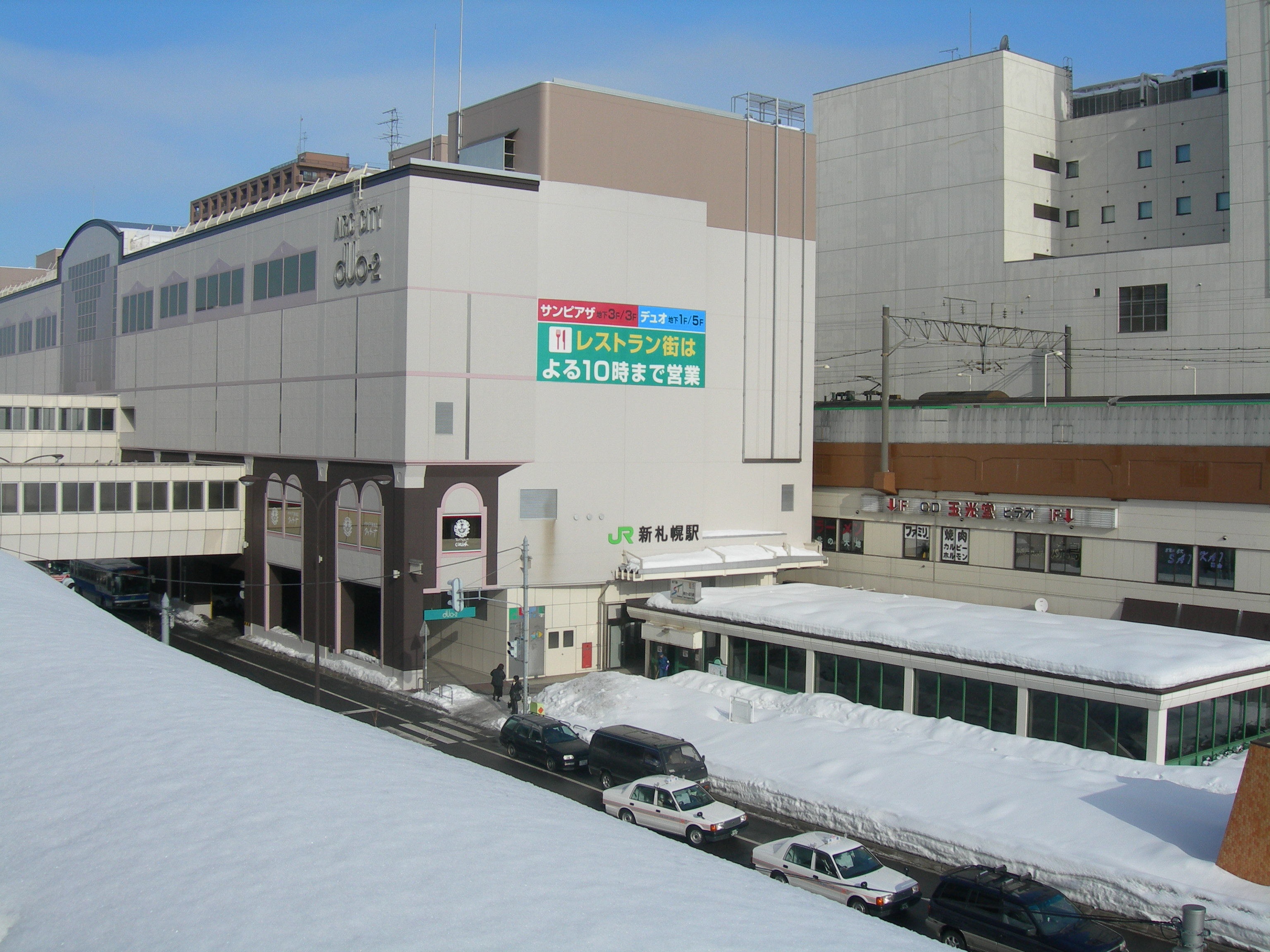
- Station building

General information
- Location: Atsubetsu-ku, Sapporo, Hokkaido; Japan
- System: JR Hokkaido station Sapporo Municipal Subway station
- Operator: JR Hokkaido; Sapporo City Transportation Bureau
- Lines: Chitose Line; Tōzai Line
- Distance: 51.5 km (32.0 mi) from Numanohata (JR); 20.1 km (12.5 mi) from Miyanosawa (Subway)
- Platforms: 2 side platforms (JR); 1 island platform (Subway)

Construction
- Accessible: Yes

Other information
- Station code: H05 (JR Hokkaido); T19 (Subway)

History
- Opened: September 9, 1973 (JR); March 21, 1982 (Subway)

Passengers
- FY2015 (JR) FY2014 (Subway): 14,120 daily (JR); 19,922 daily (Subway)

Services
Preceding station	Sapporo Municipal Subway	Following station
Hibarigaoka towards Miyanosawa	Tōzai Line	Terminus
Location
- Location within Hokkaido Location within Japan

Shin-Sapporo Station (新札幌駅, Shin-Sapporo-eki) is a railway station in Atsubetsu-ku, Sapporo, Hokkaido, Japan, operated by the Hokkaido Railway Company (JR Hokkaido) and the Sapporo Municipal Subway. The JR Hokkaido station number is "H05", while the Sapporo Municipal Subway station number is "T19". The name of the Sapporo Municipal Subway station is written "新さっぽろ駅" (with Sapporo written in hiragana instead of the typical kanji), to differentiate it from the JR Hokkaido station.

The station is the central station of Sapporo's Atsubetsu Ward serving the Shin-Sapporo subcenter of Sapporo. All passenger trains, including limited express and Airport Rapid services, stop at the station.

== Lines and trains ==
The following JR Hokkaido lines and trains terminate or pass through Shin-Sapporo station:

- Local services (Otaru/Hoshimi/Teine/Sapporo - Chitose/Tomakomai)
- Semi-Rapid Airport, Rapid Airport and Special Rapid Airport services (Otaru/Sapporo - New Chitose Airport)
- Hokuto limited express (Sapporo - Hakodate)
- Ōzora limited express (Sapporo - Kushiro)
- Tokachi limited express (Sapporo - Obihiro)
- Suzuran limited express (Sapporo - Higashi-Muroran/Muroran)

== Station layout ==
=== JR Hokkaido ===
The station consists of two elevated opposed side platforms serving two tracks. The station has automated ticket machines, automated turnstiles which accept Kitaca, and a "Midori no Madoguchi" staffed ticket office.

==== Platforms ====
1	■ Chitose Line	for New Chitose Airport, Tomakomai, Higashi-Muroran, Hakodate and Obihiro
2	■ Chitose Line	for Sapporo, Teine and Otaru

=== Tōzai Line ===
The Sapporo Municipal Subway station consists of one island platform between two tracks on the second basement level, located east of the JR Hokkaido station.

==== Platforms ====
1	■ Tōzai Line	for Miyanosawa
2	■ Tōzai Line	for Miyanosawa

== Adjacent stations ==
=== JR Hokkaido ===
Preceding station	JR Hokkaido	Following station
Kami-Nopporo towards Numanohata or New Chitose Airport	Chitose Line Local	Heiwa towards Sapporo
Kitahiroshima towards New Chitose Airport	Semi-Rapid Airport	Sapporo Terminus
Kitahiroshima towards New Chitose Airport	Rapid Airport	Shiroishi towards Otaru
Minami-Chitose towards New Chitose Airport	Special Rapid Airport	Sapporo towards Otaru
Limited Express services
Minami-Chitose towards Hakodate	Hokuto	Sapporo Terminus
Sapporo Terminus	Ōzora	Minami-Chitose towards Kushiro
Sapporo Terminus	Tokachi	Minami-Chitose towards Obihiro
Chitose towards Higashi-Muroran	Suzuran	Sapporo Terminus

== History ==
The JR Hokkaido station (formerly JNR) opened on September 9, 1973. The subway station opened on March 21, 1982.

== Surrounding area ==
- National Route 12
- Sapporo Atsubetsu Ward Office
- Atsubetsu Ward Gymnasium
- Atsubetsu Shin-Sapporo Police Station
- Atsubetsu Postal Office
- Bus Station Shin-Sapporo
- Sapporo Science Center
- Sunpiazza Shopping Center
- Sunpiazza Aquarium
- Hotel Emisia Sapporo
- Docon

== Gallery ==
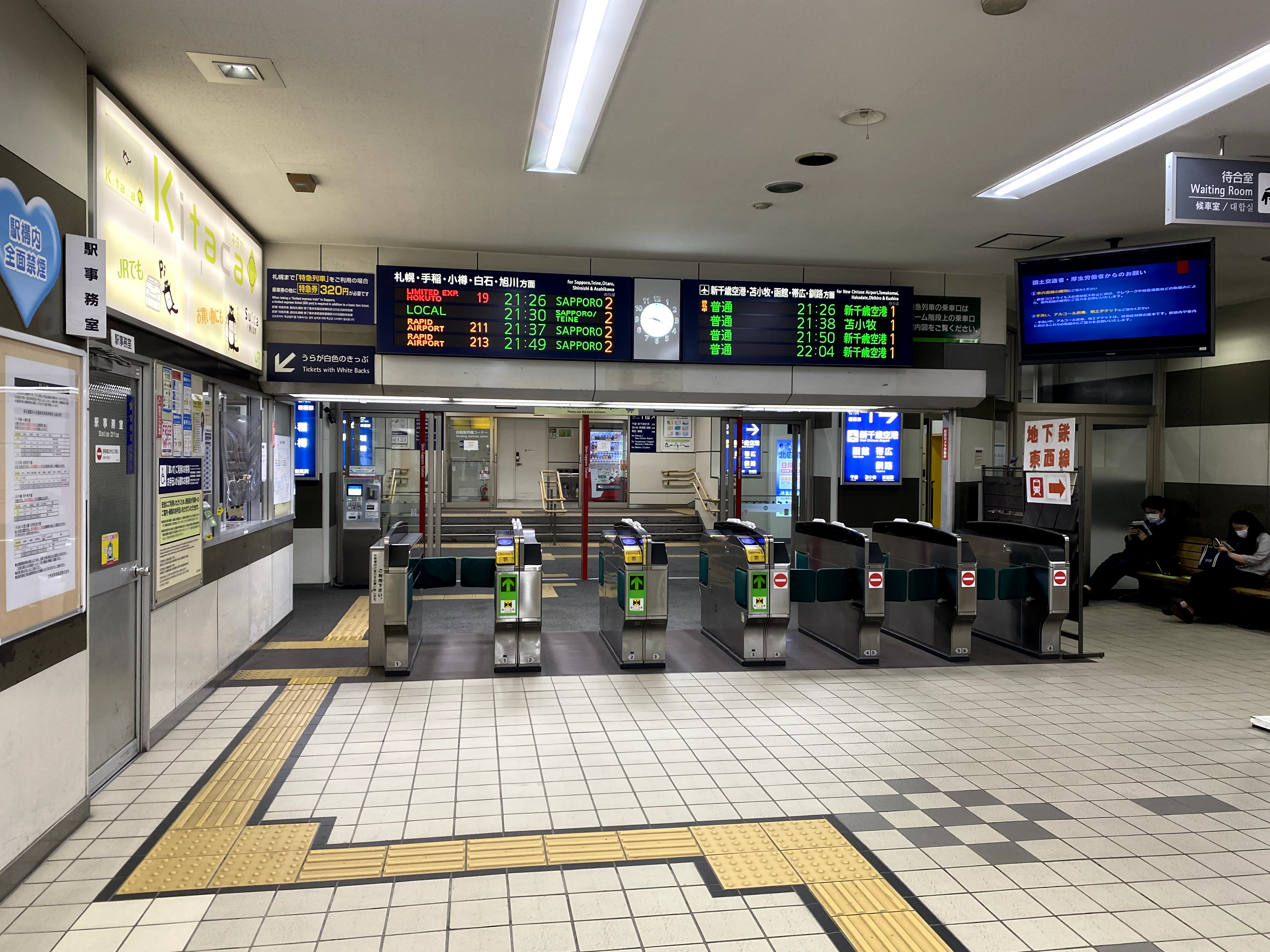
Ticket gates (September 2021)

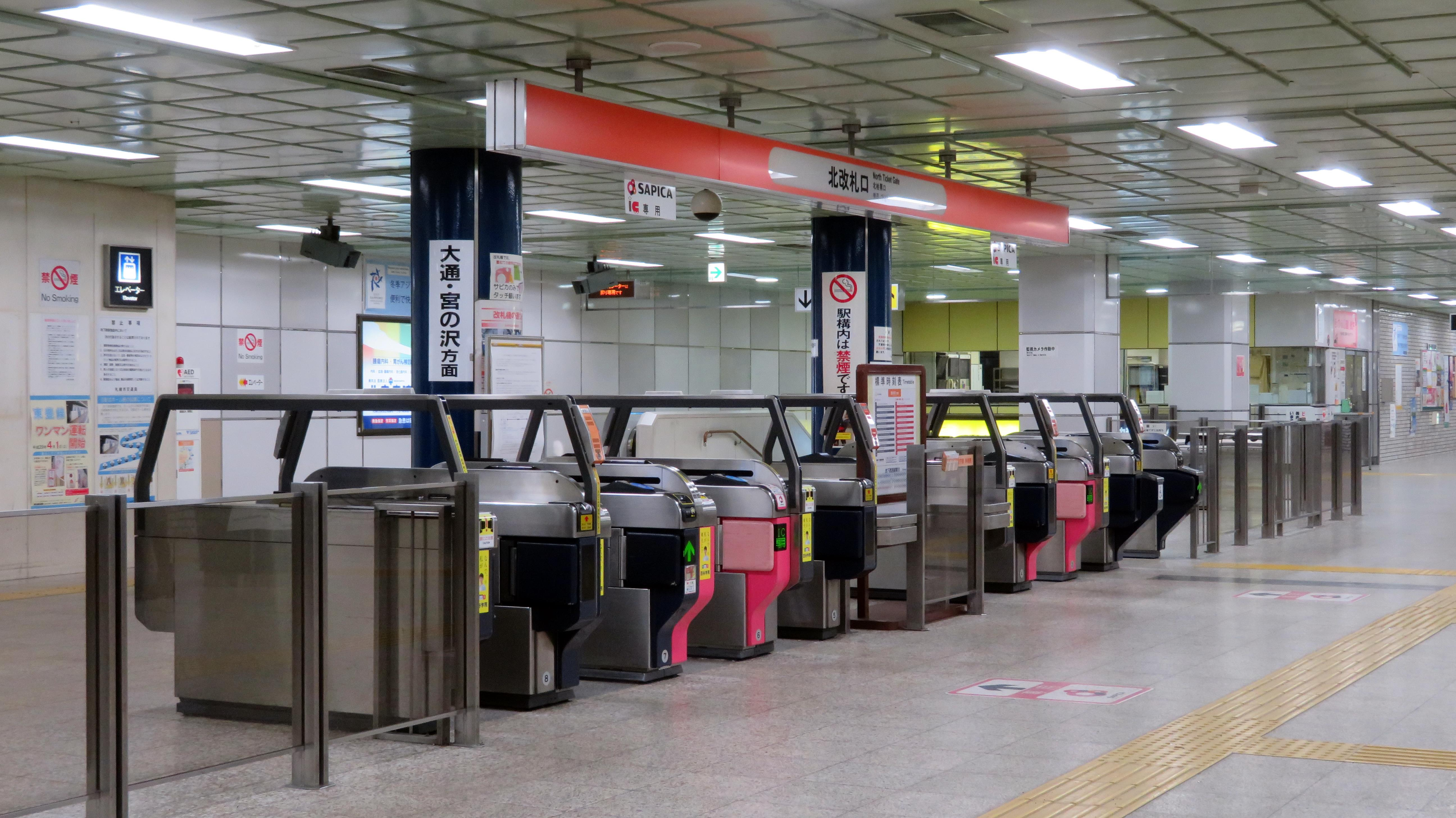
Subway ticket gates

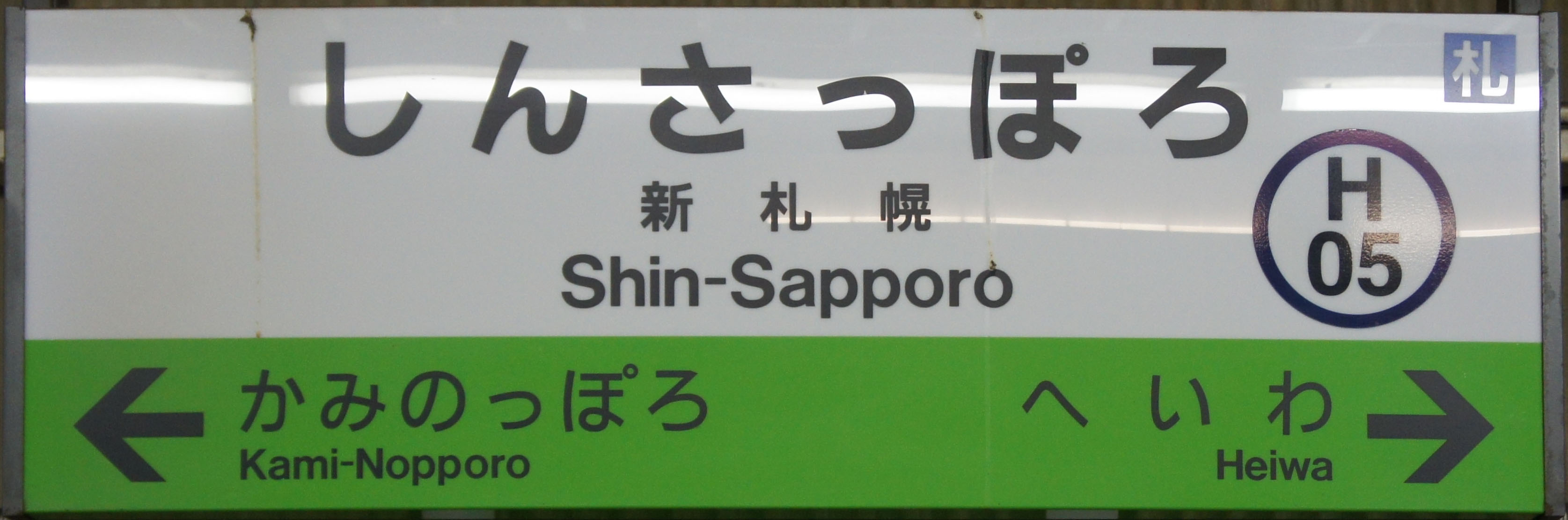
Station signboard

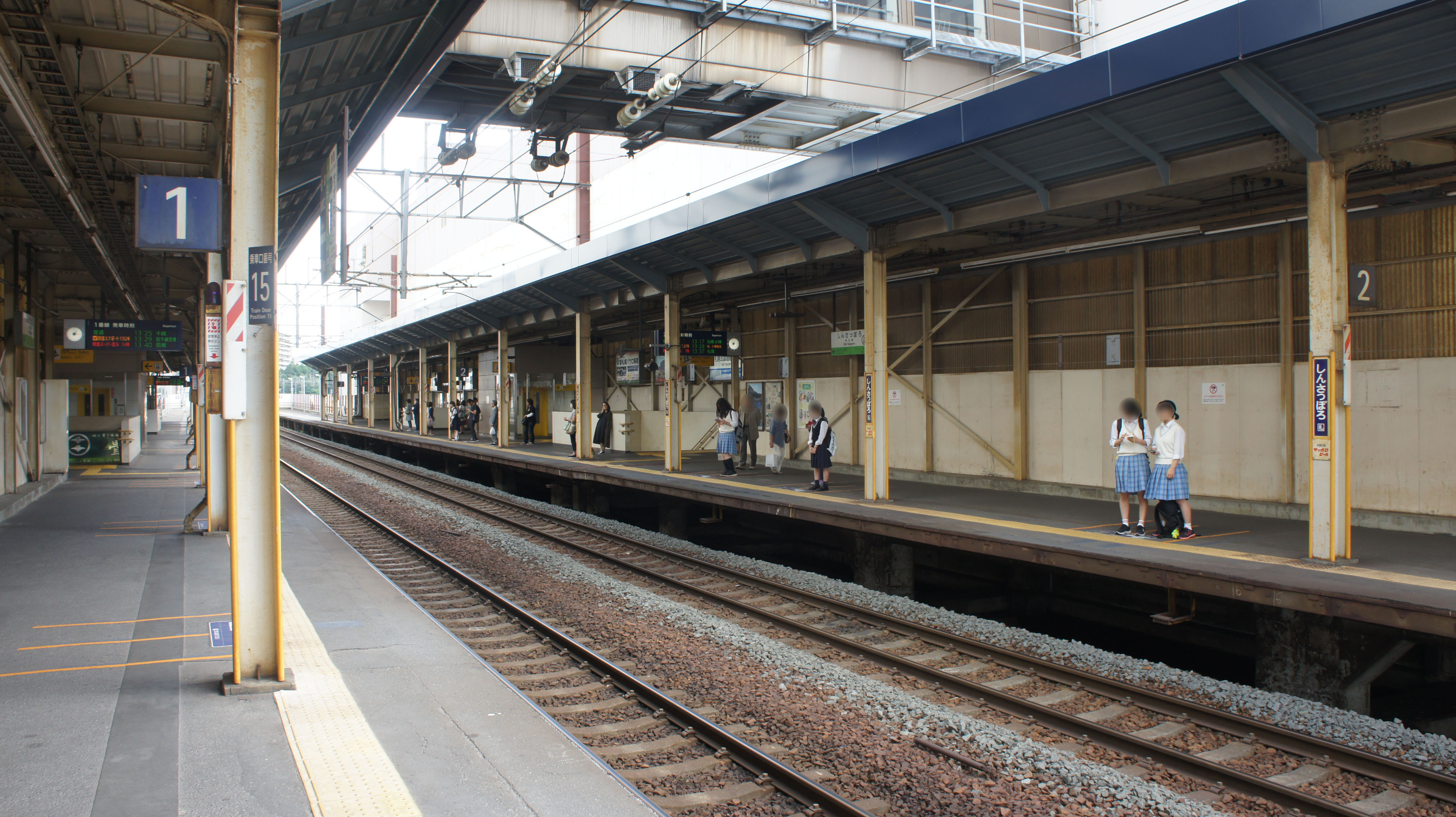
Platforms 1 and 2 of the Chitose Line platforms

== See also ==
- List of railway stations in Japan
