= Historical Village of Hokkaido =

Open-air museum in Sapporo, Japan

- 北海道開拓の村
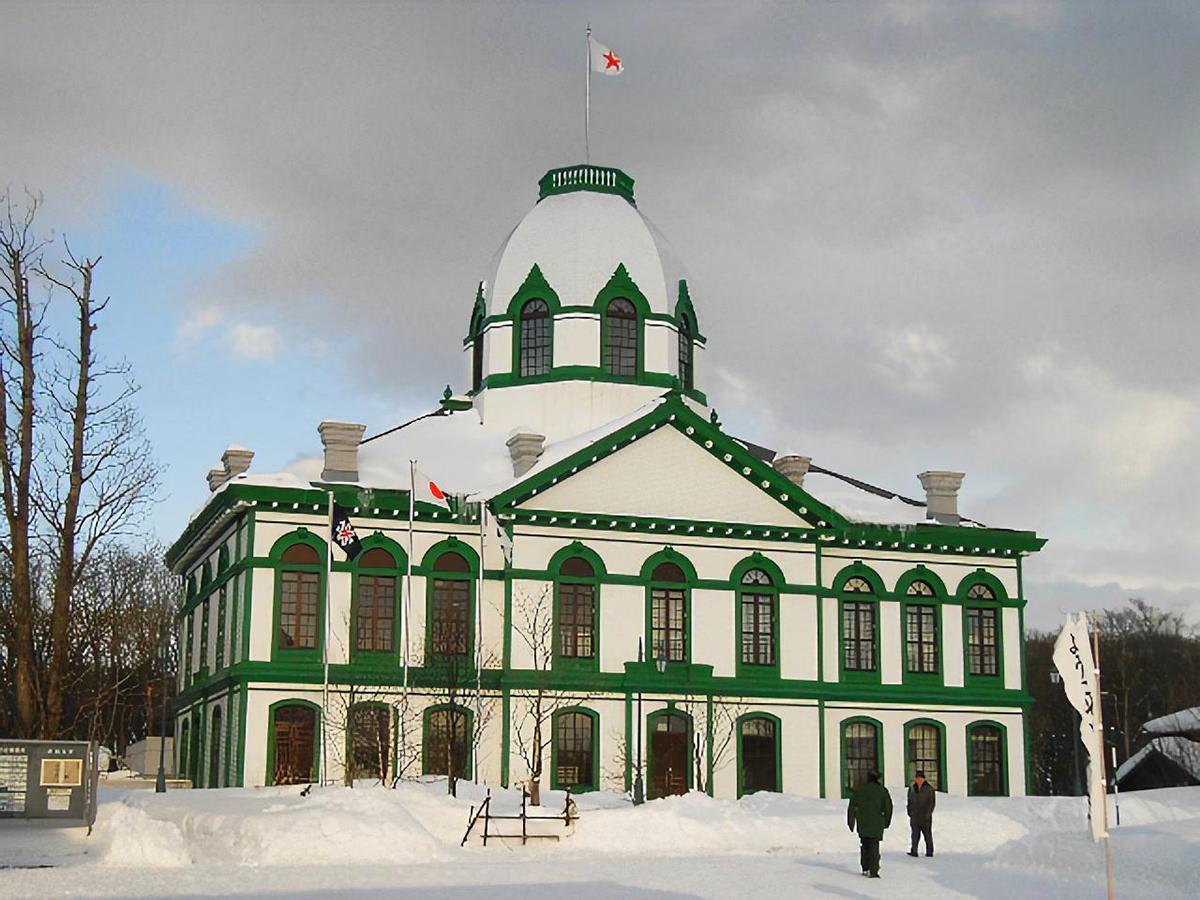
- Interactive map of the Historical Village of Hokkaido area

General information
- Location: 50-1 Konopporo, Atsubetsu-chō, Atsubetsu-ku, Sapporo, Hokkaidō, Japan
- Coordinates: 43°02′54″N 141°29′49″E
- Opened: April 1983

Website
- Official website

Historical Village of Hokkaido (北海道開拓の村, Hokkaidō Kaitaku no Mura) is an open-air museum in Sapporo, Hokkaidō, Japan. It opened in the Nopporo Shinrin Kōen Prefectural Natural Park in 1983. It includes fifty-two historical structures from the "frontier days" of the Meiji era to the Shōwa era that have been relocated and reconstructed or recreated, divided into four zones: town (with thirty-one buildings), fishing village (four buildings), farming village (fourteen buildings), and mountain village (three buildings). The museum is notable for having a rare 2 ft 6 in (762 mm) narrow gauge horse-drawn tramway.

== Access ==
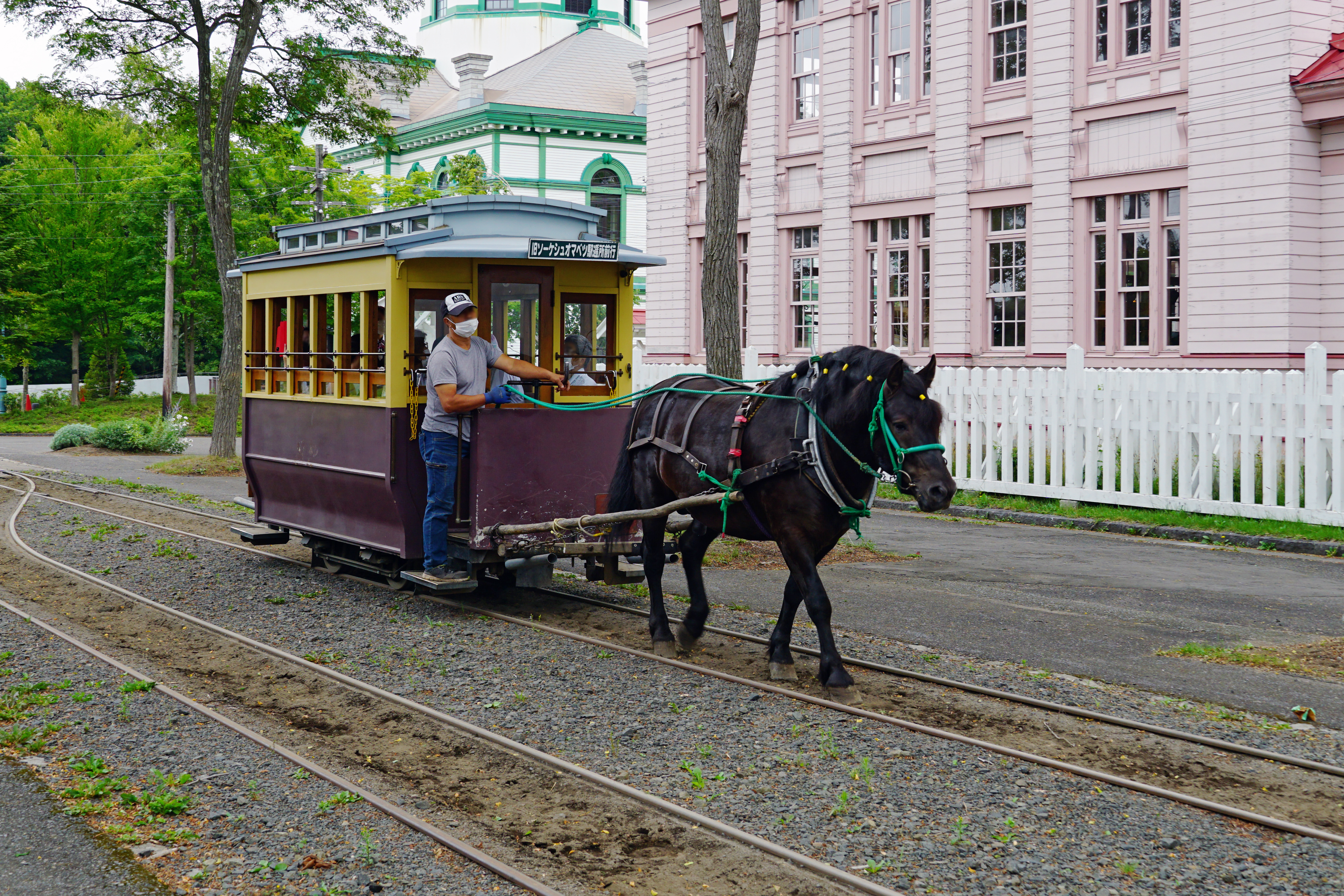
The museum's horse-drawn tramway

- JR Hokkaido Bus (Shin22 Kaitakunomura line): 15 minutes from Shinsapporo Bus Terminal to Historical Village of Hokkaido (Hokkaido Kaitakunomura) bus stop.

== See also ==
- List of Cultural Properties of Japan - structures (Hokkaidō)
- List of Historic Sites of Japan (Hokkaidō)
- Meiji-mura
- Shikoku Mura
- Hokkaido Museum
