= Hokkaido Museum =

Building in Sapporo, Japan

- 北海道博物館
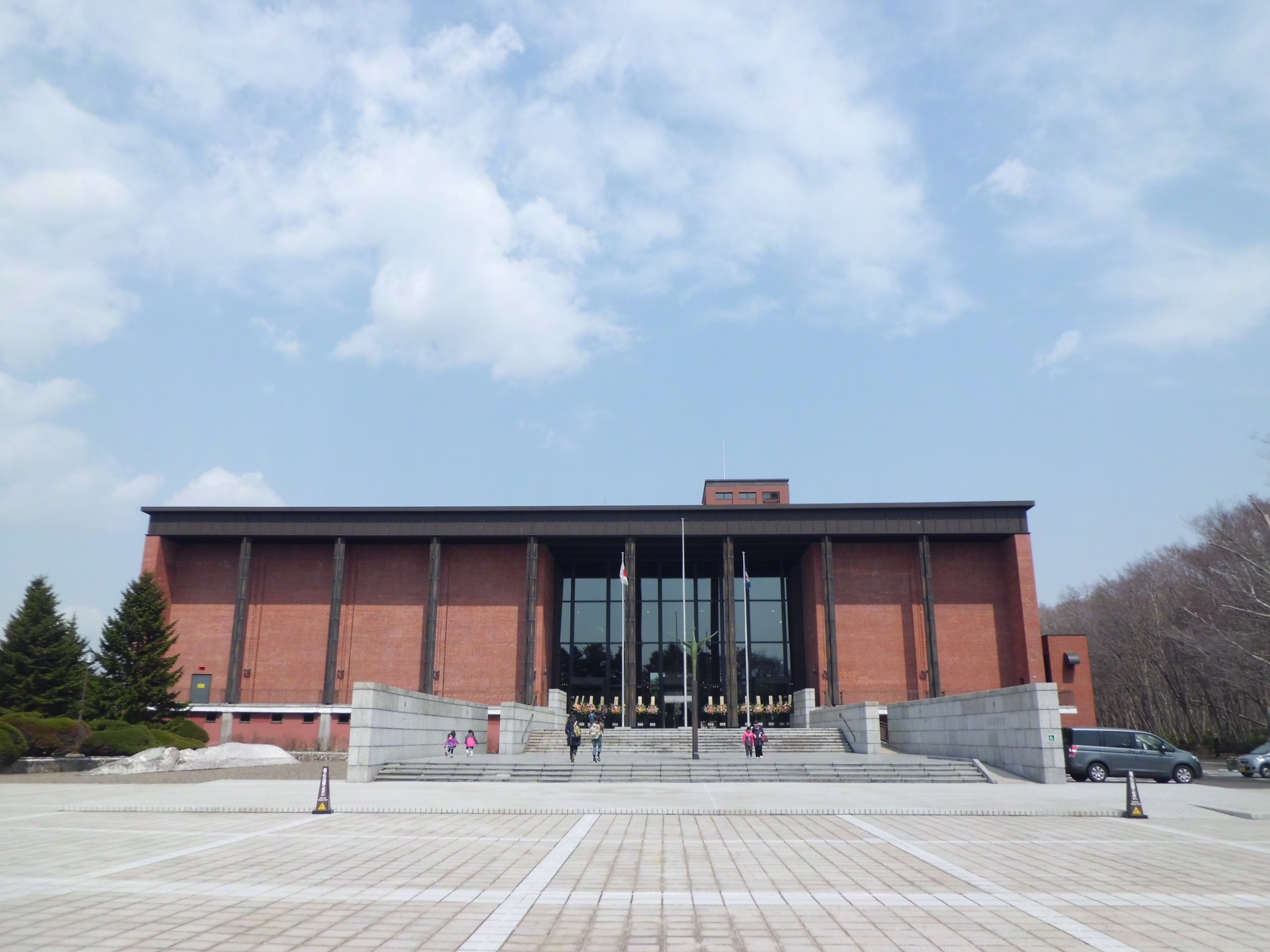
- Interactive map of the Hokkaido Museum area

General information
- Location: 53-2 Konopporo, Atsubetsu-chō, Atsubetsu-ku, Sapporo, Hokkaidō, Japan
- Coordinates: 43°03′11″N 141°29′49″E
- Opened: April 2015

Website
- Official website

Hokkaido Museum (北海道博物館, Hokkaidō Hakubutsukan) opened in Sapporo, Hokkaidō, Japan in 2015. Located within Nopporo Shinrin Kōen Prefectural Natural Park, the permanent exhibition is dedicated to the nature, history, and culture of Hokkaido. Also known as Mori-no-Charenga (森のちゃれんが), the museum integrates and replaces the Historical Museum of Hokkaido (北海道開拓記念館), which opened in 1971, and the Hokkaido Ainu Culture Research Centre (北海道立アイヌ民族文化研究センター), which opened in 1994.

== Access ==
- JR Hokkaido Bus (Shin22 Kaitakunomura line): 15 minutes from Shinsapporo Bus Terminal to Hokkaido Museum (Hokkaido hakubutsukan) bus stop.

== See also ==
- List of Cultural Properties of Japan - structures (Hokkaidō)
- List of Cultural Properties of Japan - historical materials (Hokkaidō)
- List of Historic Sites of Japan (Hokkaidō)
- Historical Village of Hokkaido
- Ainu culture
