= Shinrin-kōen Station =

Shinrin-kōen Station is the name of two train stations in Japan:

- Shinrin-Kōen Station (Hokkaido) in Hokkaido
- Shinrin-kōen Station (Saitama) in Saitama Prefecture
