= Shinrin-Kōen Station (Hokkaido) =

Railway station in Ebetsu, Hokkaido, Japan

Coordinates: 43°03′23″N 141°28′53″E

Shinrin-Kōen Station 森林公園駅
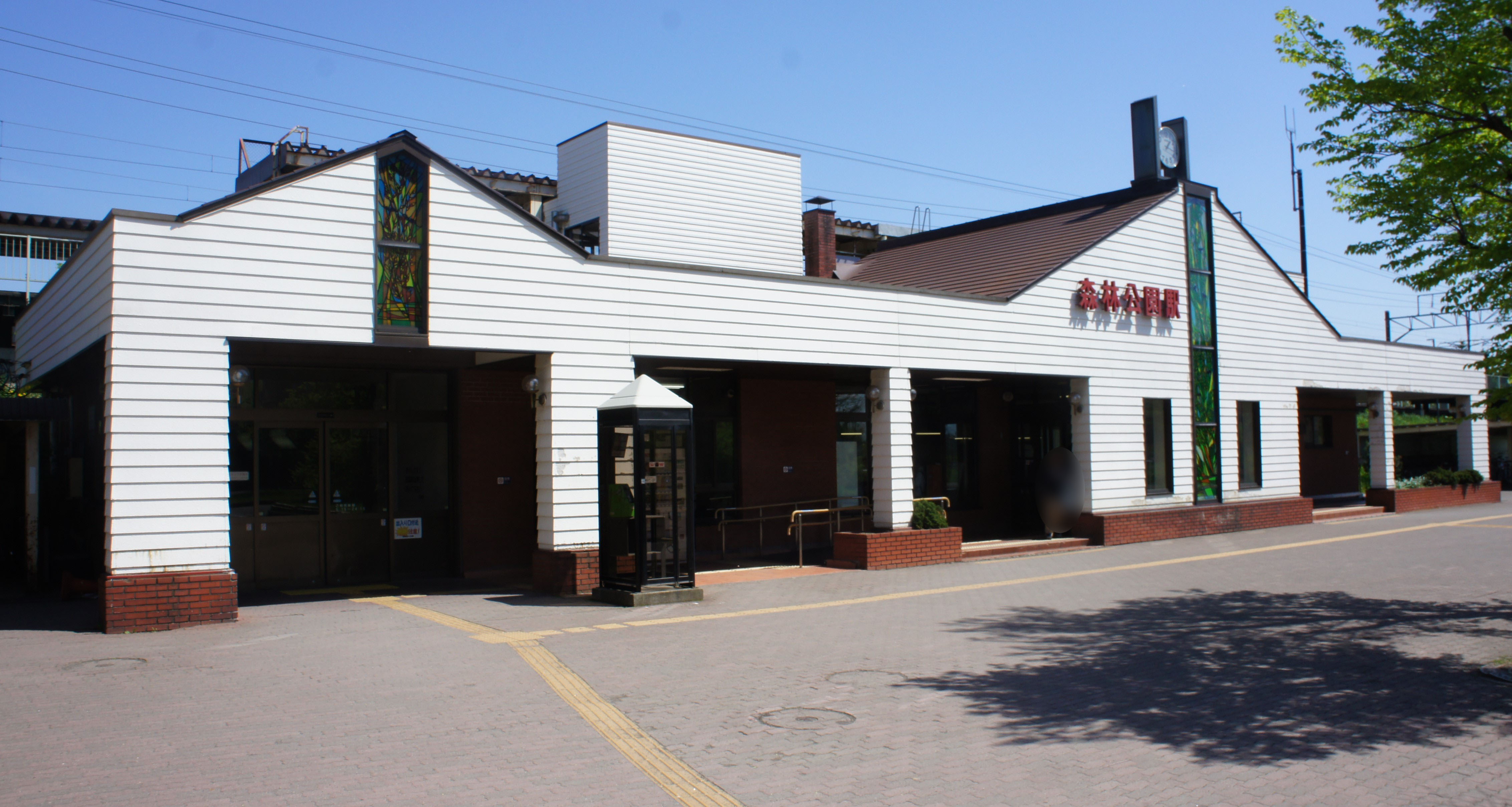

General information
- Location: Atsubetsu-ku, Sapporo, Hokkaido; Japan
- Operator: JR Hokkaido
- Line: ■ Hakodate Main Line
- Distance: 298.5 km from Hakodate
- Platforms: 2 island platforms
- Tracks: 2

Other information
- Status: Staffed
- Station code: A05

History
- Opened: September 20, 1894

Passengers
- FY2014: 4,128 daily

Services
Preceding station	JR Hokkaido	Following station
Atsubetsu towards Hakodate	Hakodate Main Line	Ōasa towards Asahikawa
Location
- Location within Japan

Shinrin-Kōen Station (森林公園駅, Shinrin-Kōen-eki) is a railway station on the Hakodate Main Line in Atsubetsu-ku, Sapporo, Hokkaido, Japan, operated by Hokkaido Railway Company (JR Hokkaido). The station is numbered "A05".

The station takes its name from the Nopporo Shinrin Kōen Prefectural Natural Park, located 20 minutes' walking distance from the station.

== Lines ==
Shinrin-Kōen Station is served by the Hakodate Main Line.

== Station layout ==
The station consists of two side platforms serving two tracks. The station has automated ticket machines, automated turnstiles which accept Kitaca, and a "Midori no Madoguchi" staffed ticket office.

=== Platforms ===
1	■ Hakodate Main Line	for Sapporo and Otaru
2	■ Hakodate Main Line	for Ebetsu and Iwamizawa

== Adjacent stations ==
«	Service	»
Hakodate Main Line
Atsubetsu	Local	Ōasa
Semi-Rapid: Does not stop at this station
Limited Express Sōya: Does not stop at this station
Limited Express Okhotsk: Does not stop at this station

== History ==
Shinrin-Kōen Station opened on 20 September 1984.

== Surrounding area ==
- Nopporo Shinrin Kōen Prefectural Natural Park
  - Centennial Memorial Tower
  - Historical Village of Hokkaido
  - Hokkaido Museum
- National Route 12 (to Asahikawa)
- Atsubetsu Shinrin-Kōen Police Station
- Shinrin-Kōen Station Post Office
- Shilla Shinrin-Kōen onsen

== See also ==
- List of railway stations in Japan
- Shinrinkōen Station (Saitama), a similarly named station on the Tobu Tojo Line in Saitama Prefecture
