= Hibarigaoka Station =

Hibarigaoka Station is the name of two train stations in Japan:

- Hibarigaoka Station (Hokkaido) (ひばりが丘駅) in Hokkaido
- Hibarigaoka Station (Tokyo) (ひばりヶ丘駅) in Tokyo
