= Sapporo Ryūtsū Center =

Convention center located in Shiroishi-ku, Sapporo, Hokkaido, Japan

Sapporo Ryūtsū Center AXES Sapporo
- Interactive map of Sapporo Ryūtsū Center; AXES Sapporo
- Address: 4-3-55 Shiroishi-ku
- Location: Shiroishi-ku, Sapporo, Hokkaido
- Coordinates: 43°02′18″N 141°27′00″E,
- Owner: Sapporo Industrial Distribution Promotion Association

Construction
- Opened: 1984

Website
- Official site

Sapporo Ryūtsū Center (札幌流通総合会館) also known as AXES Sapporo (アクセスサッポロ), is a convention center located in Shiroishi-ku, Sapporo, Hokkaido, Japan.

== Overview ==
Opened in March 1984, this multipurpose center comprises a large indoor exhibition area of approximately 5,000 m^{2}, and a separated building with: a reception hall, special meeting rooms, class rooms and conference rooms and also a free space in every one of its 3 floors. In addition to this it also includes a large outdoor exhibition area of approximately 2,400 m^{2}.

So far, has been used for conferences, business conventions, commercial training programs, as well as automobile exhibitions (the Sapporo Auto Salon), and all kinds of fairs and expositions (the Health & Beauty Fair Sapporo).

Sapporo Ryūtsū Center was also used as a basketball venue for the Rera Kamuy Hokkaido team in 2010.

== Access ==
- Tōzai Line: 20 minutes walk from Ōyachi Station.
- JR Hokkaido: 20 minutes walk from Atsubetsu Station.
