= Nopporo Shinrin Kōen Prefectural Natural Park =

Natural park in Hokkaido, Japan

Coordinates: 43°03′08″N 141°30′01″E

- 道立自然公園野幌森林公園
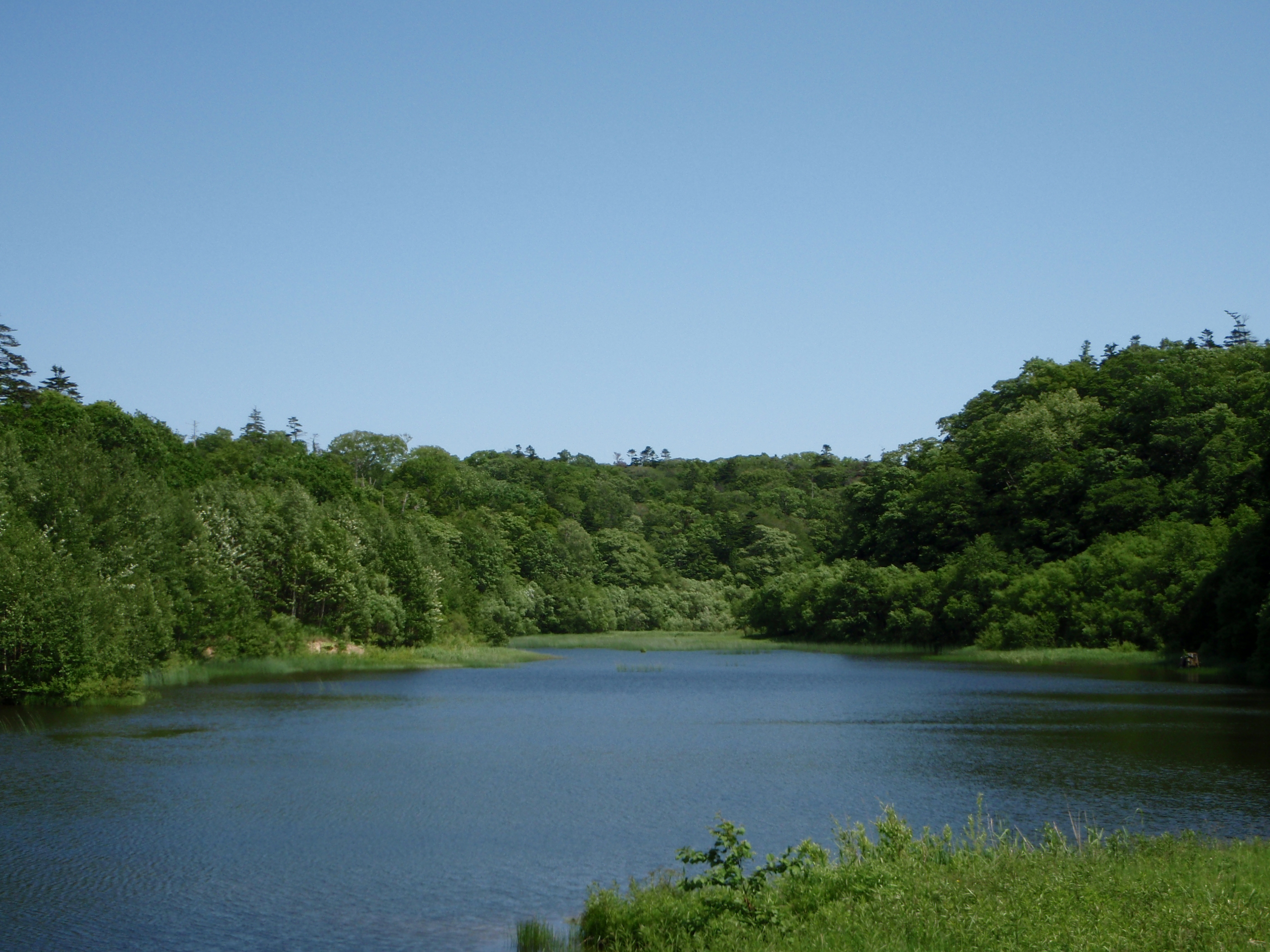
- Nopporo Forest Park (Special Natural Monument)
- Interactive map of Nopporo Shinrin Kōen Prefectural Natural Park
- Location: Hokkaidō, Japan
- Area: 2,051 ha (5,070 acres)
- Established: 1968

Nopporo Shinrin Kōen Prefectural Natural Park (道立自然公園野幌森林公園, Dōritsu shizen kōen Nopporo Shinrin Kōen) is a Prefectural Natural Park in western Hokkaidō, Japan. Established in 1968, the park spans the municipalities of Ebetsu, Kitahiroshima, and Sapporo.

The park is home of a number of attractions such as, the Hokkaido Centennial Memorial Tower, the Historical Museum of Hokkaido and the Historical Village of Hokkaido; covering the culture, history and lifestyle of Hokkaido.

== Overview ==
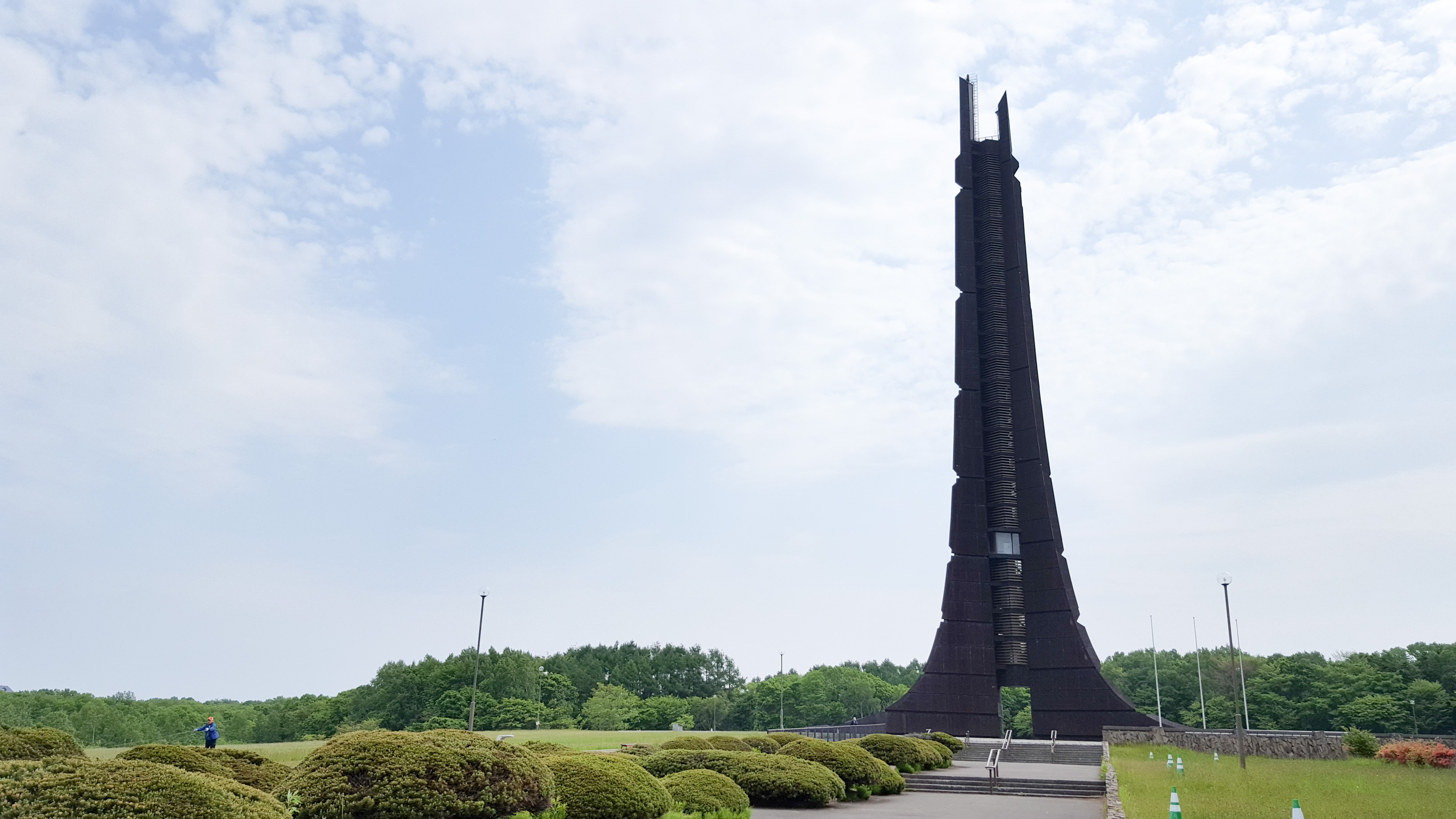
Centennial Memorial Tower

The park has more than 510 plant species, including 110 tree species, as well as more than 200 species of mushrooms, 140 species of birds and 1,300 species of insects. Yezo squirrels, Japanese hares, Yezo brown frogs, Hokkaido salamanders and other animals inhabit the park.

The biggest symbol of the park is the Centennial Memorial Tower located near the western entrance. The tower was built in commemoration of the Hokkaidō Centenary, in September, 1970. The height of the tower is 100 m, and includes a view room located at a height of 23.5 m inside the tower. However the tower will be demolished in May 2024 due to the high cost of maintaining the tower.

The Historical Museum of Hokkaido, located inside the Park, details Hokkaido's development from prehistoric to modern times, the section on the indigenous Ainu has displays of clothing, a house, items used for trade with the Japanese and other artifacts, along with descriptions of their forced assimilation into Japanese culture. Another section is about Hokkaido's early contacts with Russia, the lives of 19th-century Japanese pioneers, the opening of Hakodate Port, the establishment of Sapporo Agricultural College, and more. Finally, the Living Experience Room, provides many interactive displays.

The Historical Village of Hokkaido. also located inside the Park, is an open-air museum with more than 50 historical Japanese and Western-style buildings, dating mostly from the Meiji and Taisho periods, and brought here from different locations in the Hokkaido Prefecture.

The Shizen Fureai Kan, a nature center, located at the north side of the park, provides information about the nature in the park.

== Access ==
- JR Hokkaido: 20 minutes walking distance from Shinrin-Kōen Station.
- JR Bus: 15 minutes from Shin-Sapporo Station (JR Hokkaido & Sapporo Subway) to Nopporo Shinrin Koen Bus stop.

== See also ==
- National Parks of Japan
