= Hokusei Gakuen University =

University in Sapporo, Japan

Coordinates: 43°1′29″N 141°26′55.5″E

- 北星学園大学
- Type: Private
- Established: 1962
- Endowment: N/A
- Chancellor: Kazuhiko Nakamura
- Faculty: 117 full-time 19 part-time
- Students: 4337
- Undergraduates: 4284
- Postgraduates: 53
- Location: Sapporo, Hokkaidō, Japan
- Campus: Urban
- Website: www.hokusei.ac.jp

Hokusei Gakuen University (北星学園大学, Hokusei Gakuen daigaku) is a four-year private university in Atsubetsu-ku, Sapporo, Hokkaidō, Japan. The university is run by Hokusei Gakuen School System, whose education philosophy is based on Christianity.

Its name Hokusei (北星) means "north (北)" and "star (星)." It is derived from the biblical reference "Shine like stars, in a dark world" (Philippians 2:15). It was recommended by Japanese scholar and politician Inazo Nitobe and praised by the founder of the university Sarah Clara Smith. The university shares its campus with the two-year Hokusei Gakuen University Junior College and Hokusei Gakuen University Graduate School.

== History ==
The history of Hokusei Gakuen University goes back to 1887, when an American missionary of the United Presbyterian Church of North America, Sarah Clara Smith, founded "Smith Girls' School." In 1894, the school was relocated and renamed "Hokusei Women’s School" as Japanese scholar Inazo Nitobe recommended.

After Smith returned to the United States, the school experienced several renovations and expansions. In 1962, Hokusei Gakuen University was officially founded with the Department of English, Department of Social Welfare, and School of Humanities.

In 2007, the Hokusei Gakuen School System marked its 120th anniversary since the foundation of Smith Girls’ School and planned to have a ceremony in Chūō-ku, Sapporo with other Hokusei Gakuen schools: Hokusei Gakuen University Junior College, Hokusei Gakuen University High School, Hokusei Gakuen Girls' Junior & Senior High School, and Hokusei Yoichi High School.

== Academics and organization ==
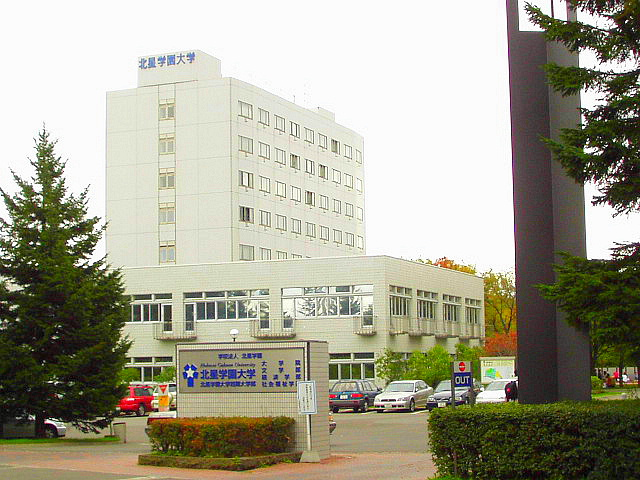

"Kirari," one of the Student Activities Buildings.

=== Undergraduate units ===
- School of Humanities
  - Department of English
  - Department of Psychology and Applied Communication
- School of Economics
  - Department of Economics
  - Department of Management Information
  - Department of Law and Economics
- School of Social Welfare
  - Department of Social Policy
  - Department of Social Work
  - Department of Psychology for Well-being

=== Postgraduate units ===
- Graduate School of Literature
- Graduate School of Economics
- Graduate School of Social Welfare

== Notable alumni ==
- Waki Yamato, Japanese manga artist

== Sources ==
- Hokusei Gakuen University/Hokusei Gakuen University Junior College Campus Guide 2007
