= JR Bus =

Bus operations of the Japan Railways Group companies

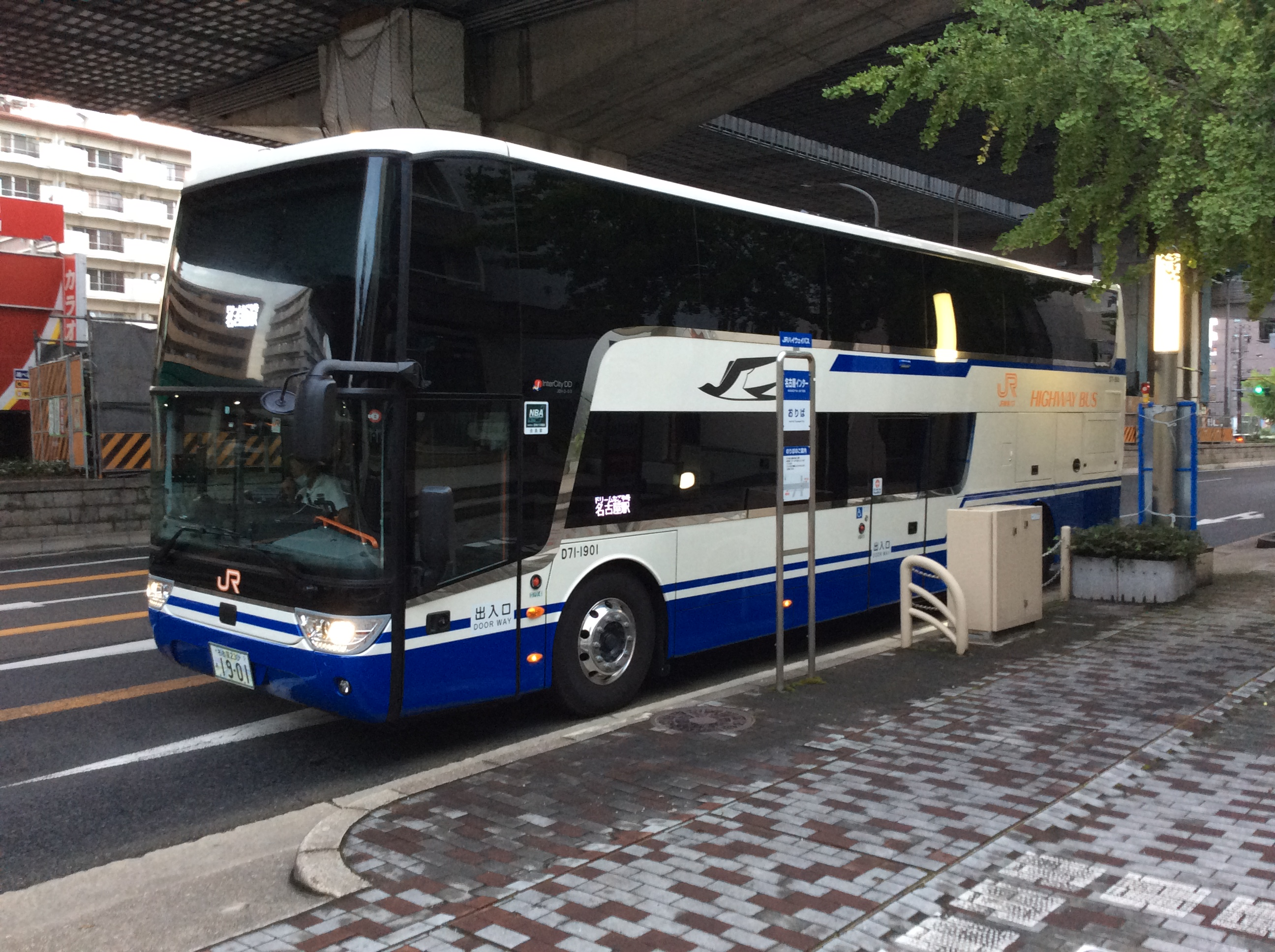
Van Hool Astromega operated by JR Tokai Bus

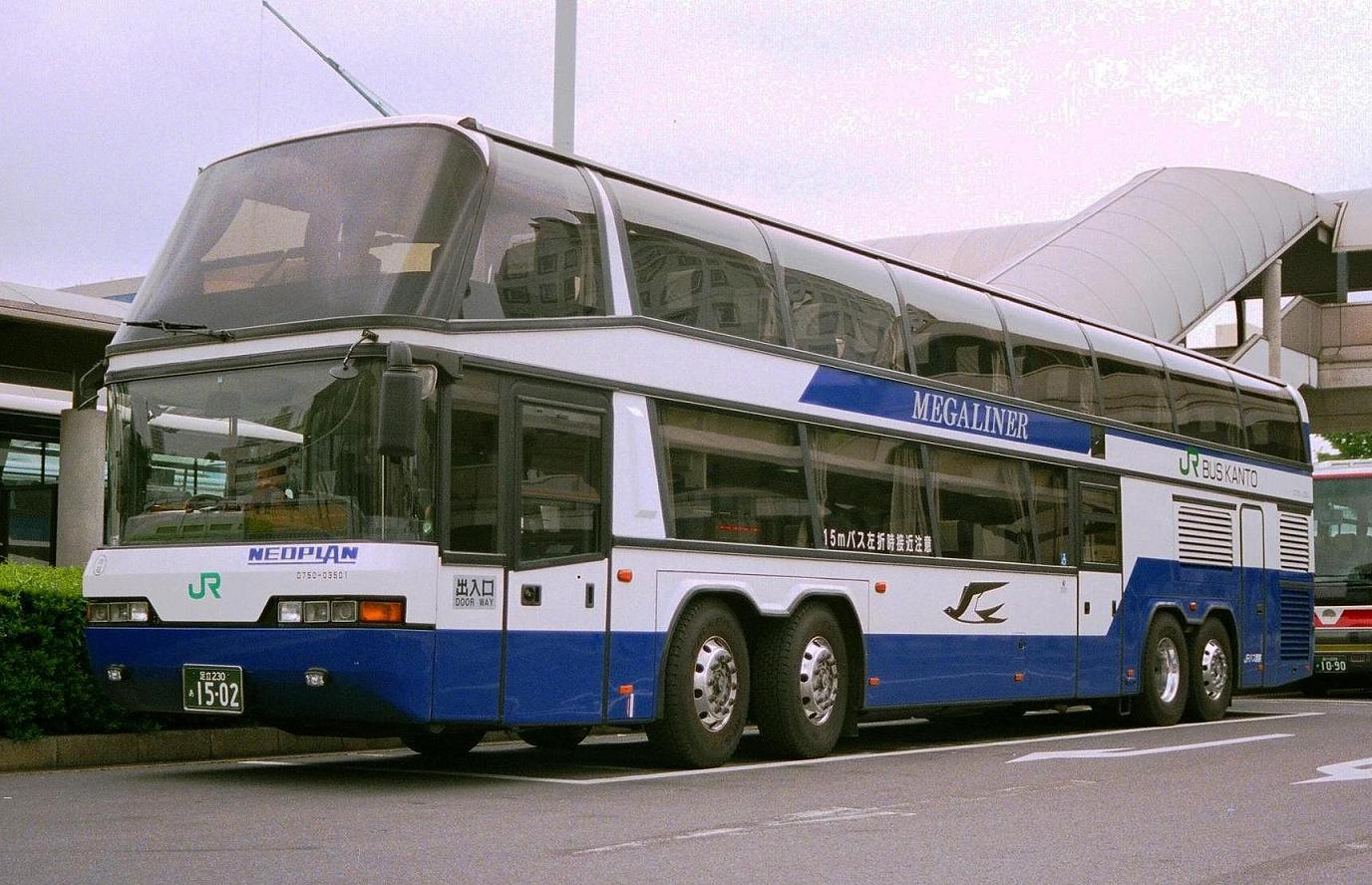
Neoplan Megaliner operated by JR Bus Kanto

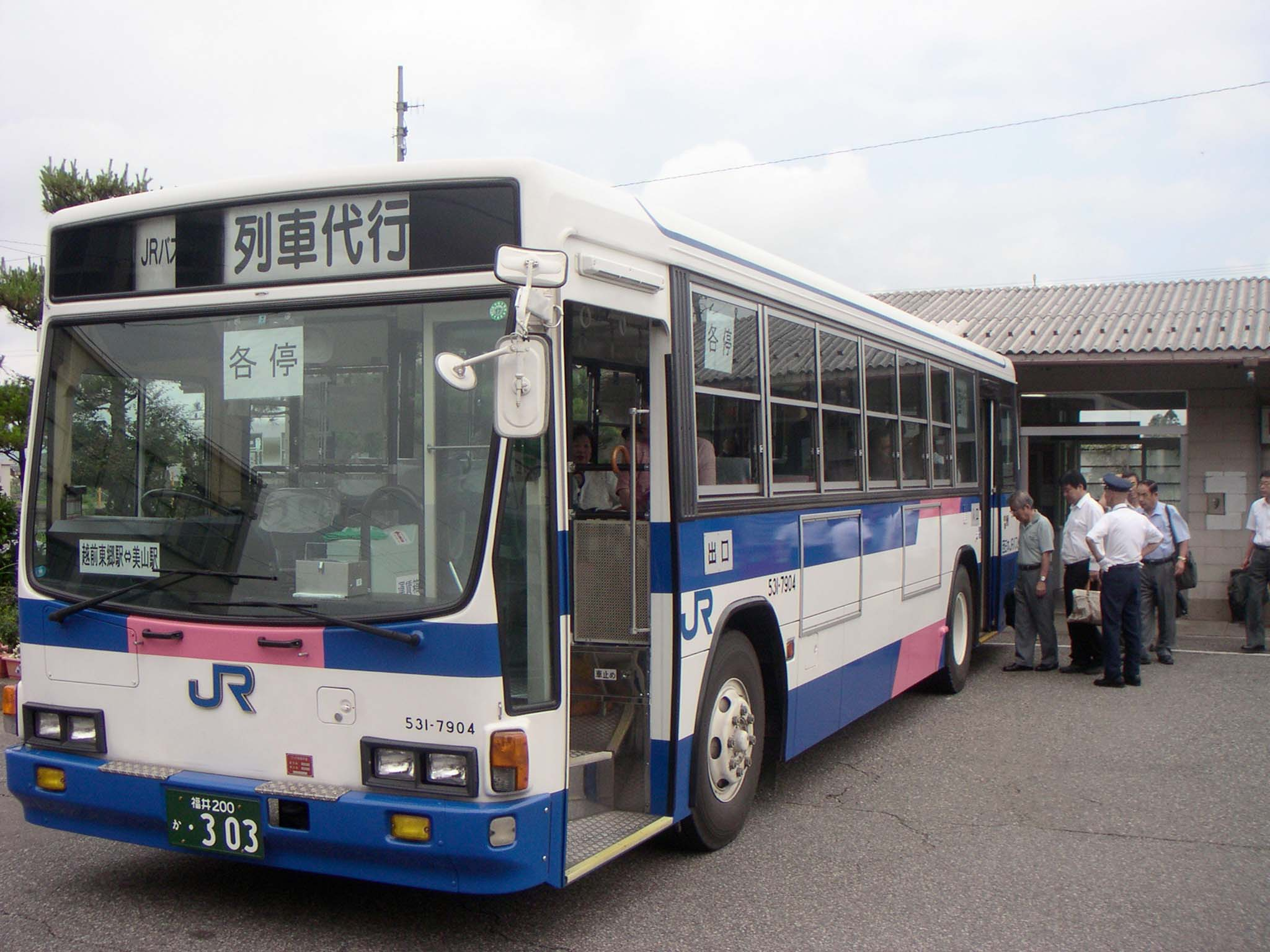
Substitution bus for temporarily suspended Etsumi North Line railway operated by West JR Bus

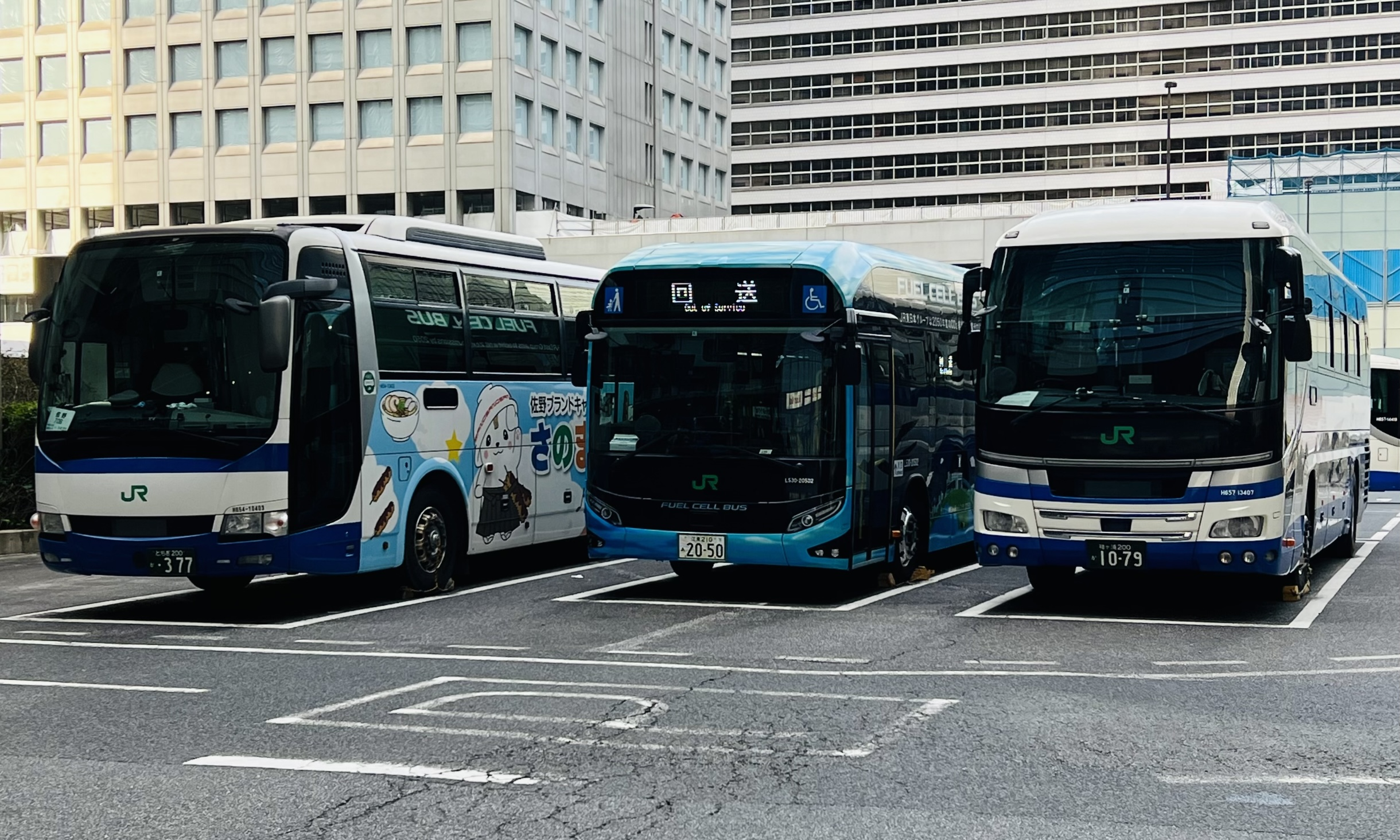
Several buses operated by JR Bus Kanto parked at Tokyo Station in November 2022

JR Bus collectively refers to the bus operations of Japan Railways Group (JR Group) companies in Japan. JR Bus is operated by six regional companies, with JR East and JR West operating two each while the others operate one each. JR Bus companies provide regional, long distance, and chartered bus services.

== List of companies ==
Bus company	Operation area	Parent company
JR Hokkaido Bus Company	Hokkaidō region	Hokkaido Railway Company
JR Bus Tohoku Company	Tōhoku region	East Japan Railway Company
JR Bus Kanto Company	Kantō region	East Japan Railway Company
JR Tokai Bus Company	Tōkai region	Central Japan Railway Company
West Japan JR Bus Company	Hokuriku region, Kansai region	West Japan Railway Company
Chugoku JR Bus Company	Chūgoku region	West Japan Railway Company
JR Shikoku Bus Company	Shikoku region	Shikoku Railway Company
JR Kyushu Bus Company	Kyūshū region	Kyushu Railway Company

== History ==
The Ministry of Railways of Japan started its first bus operation in Aichi Prefecture in 1930 and gradually expanded bus routes. The Japanese National Railways (JNR), public corporation established in 1949, succeeded the bus operations, then called Kokutetsu Bus or JNR Bus. In 1987, JNR was divided into regional railway companies together with its bus operations. JR companies later separated their bus operations to subsidiaries in 1988 (JR East, JR Central, JR West), 2000 (JR Hokkaido), 2001 (JR Kyushu) and 2004 (JR Shikoku).

== Examples of vehicles ==
=== Regional route vehicles ===
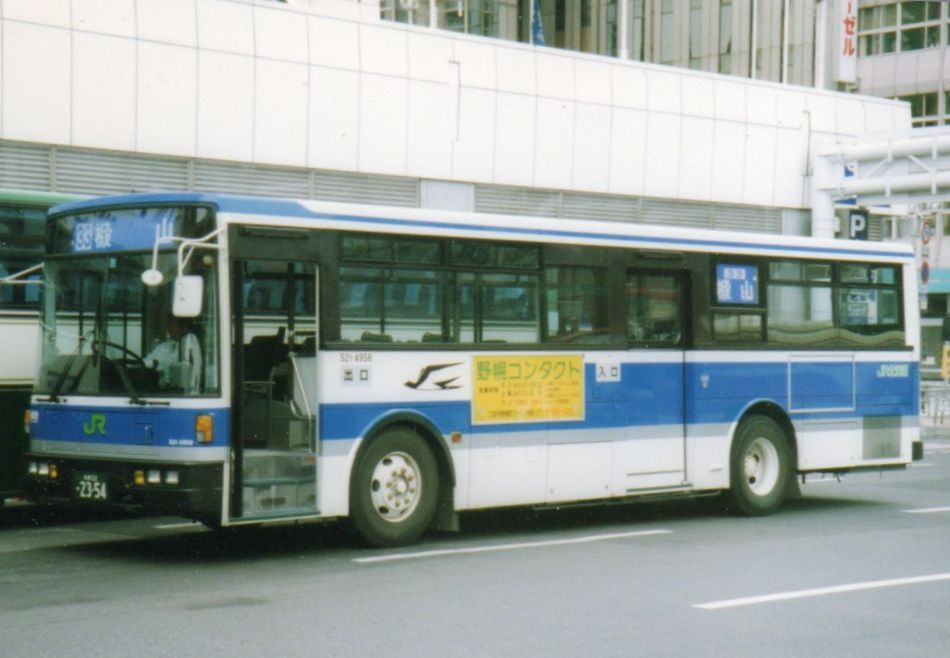
JR Hokkaidō bus 521-4956

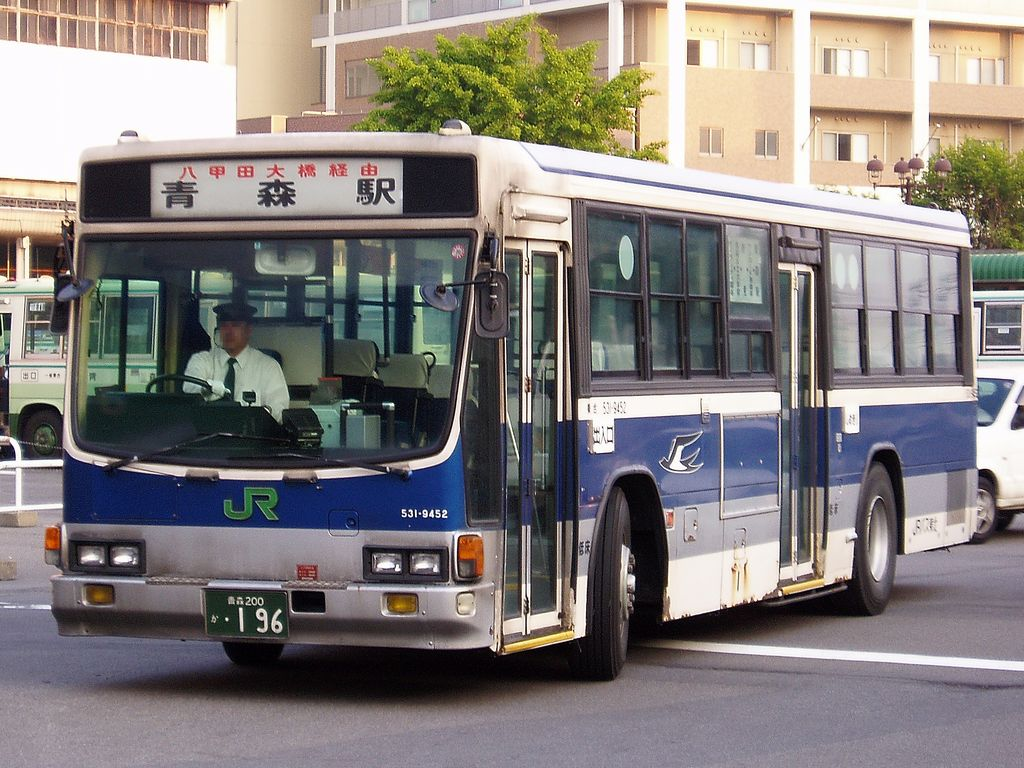
JR Bus Tohoku 531-9452

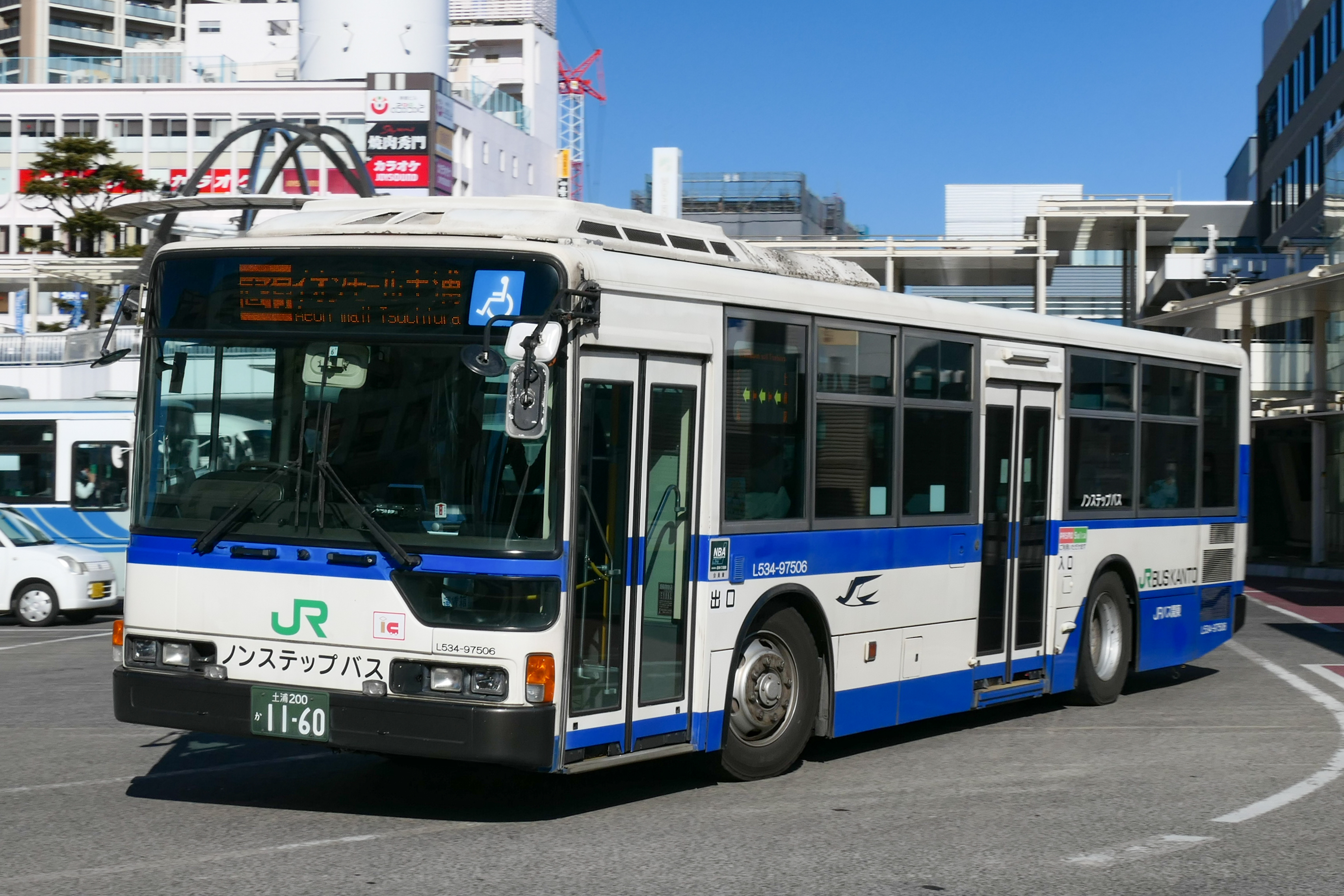
JR Bus Kanto L534-97506

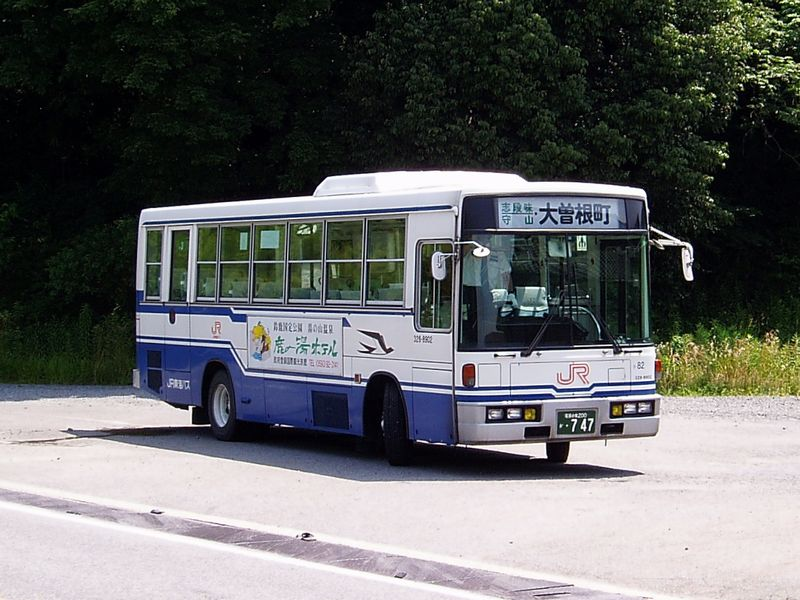
JR Tokai Bus 328-8902

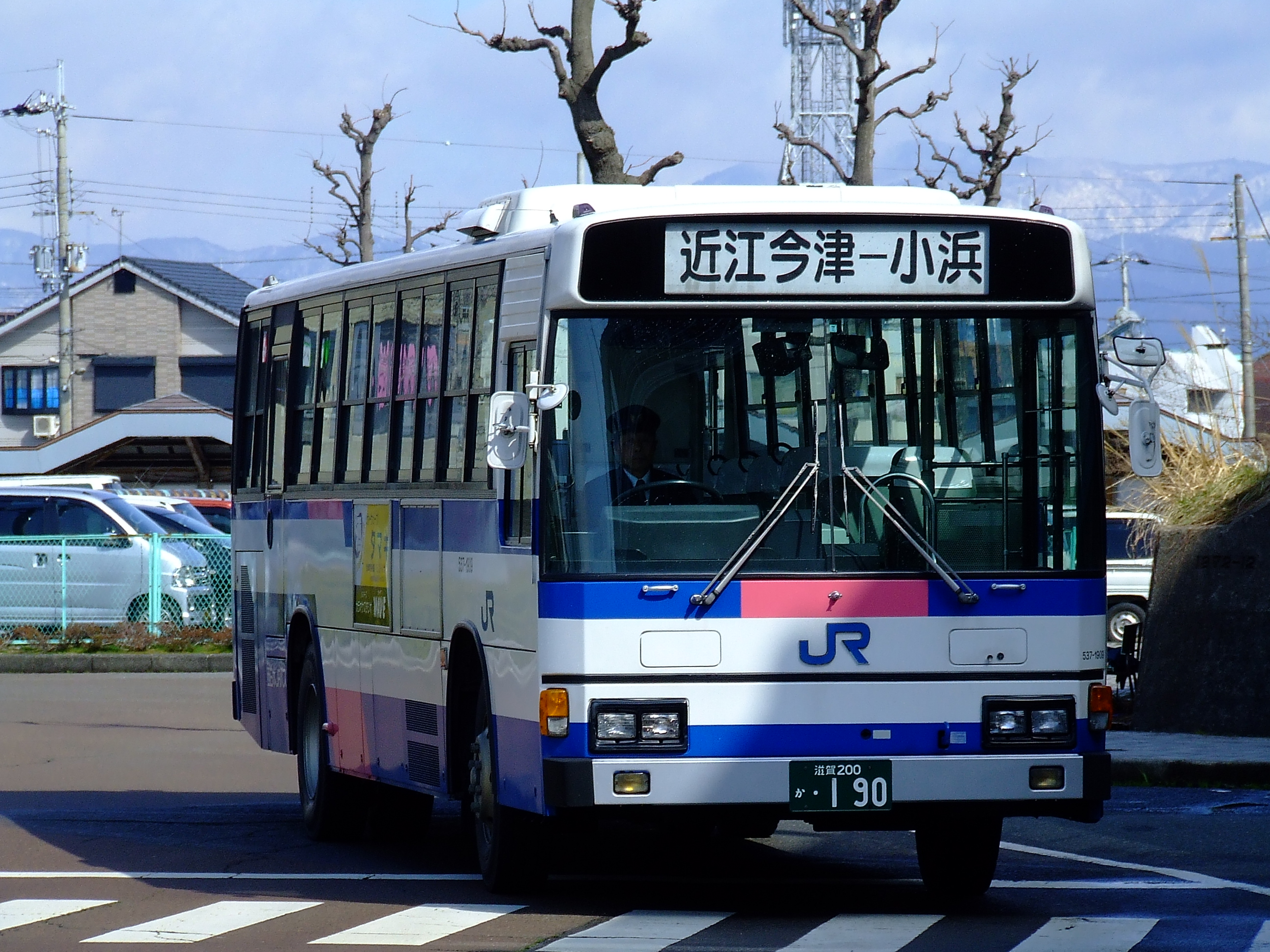
Nishinihon JR Bus 537-1909

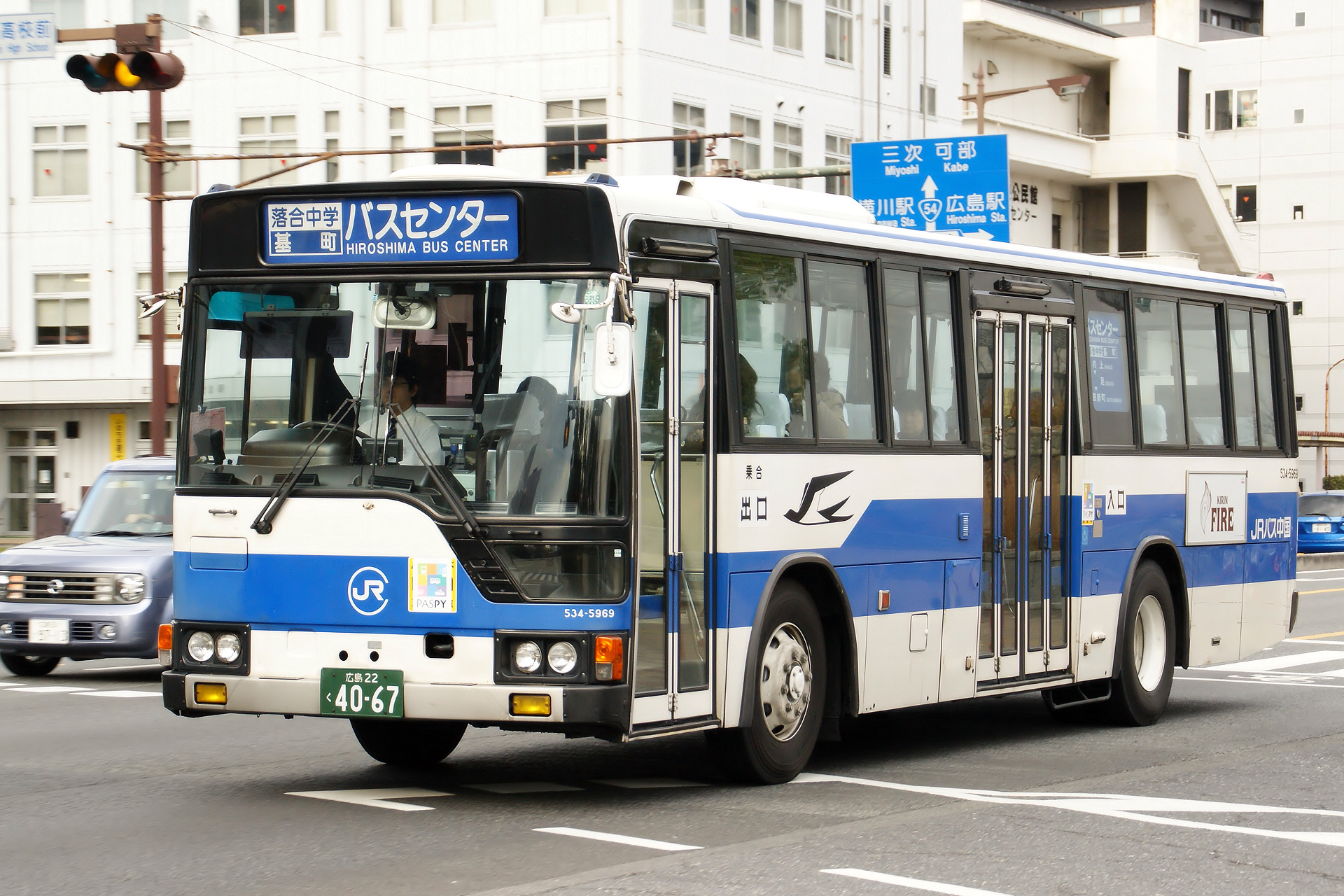
Chugoku JR Bus 534-5969

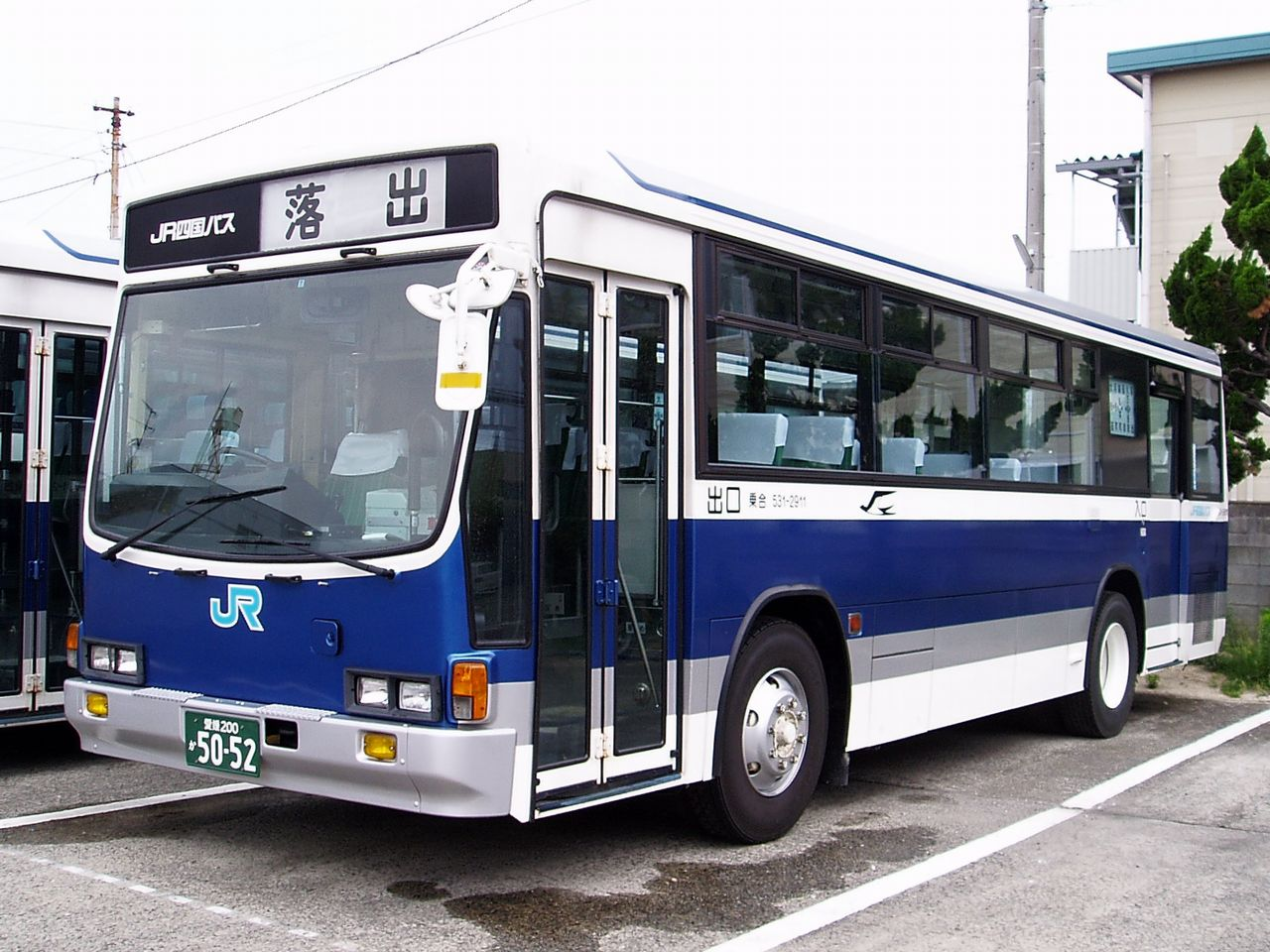
JR Shikoku Bus 531-2911

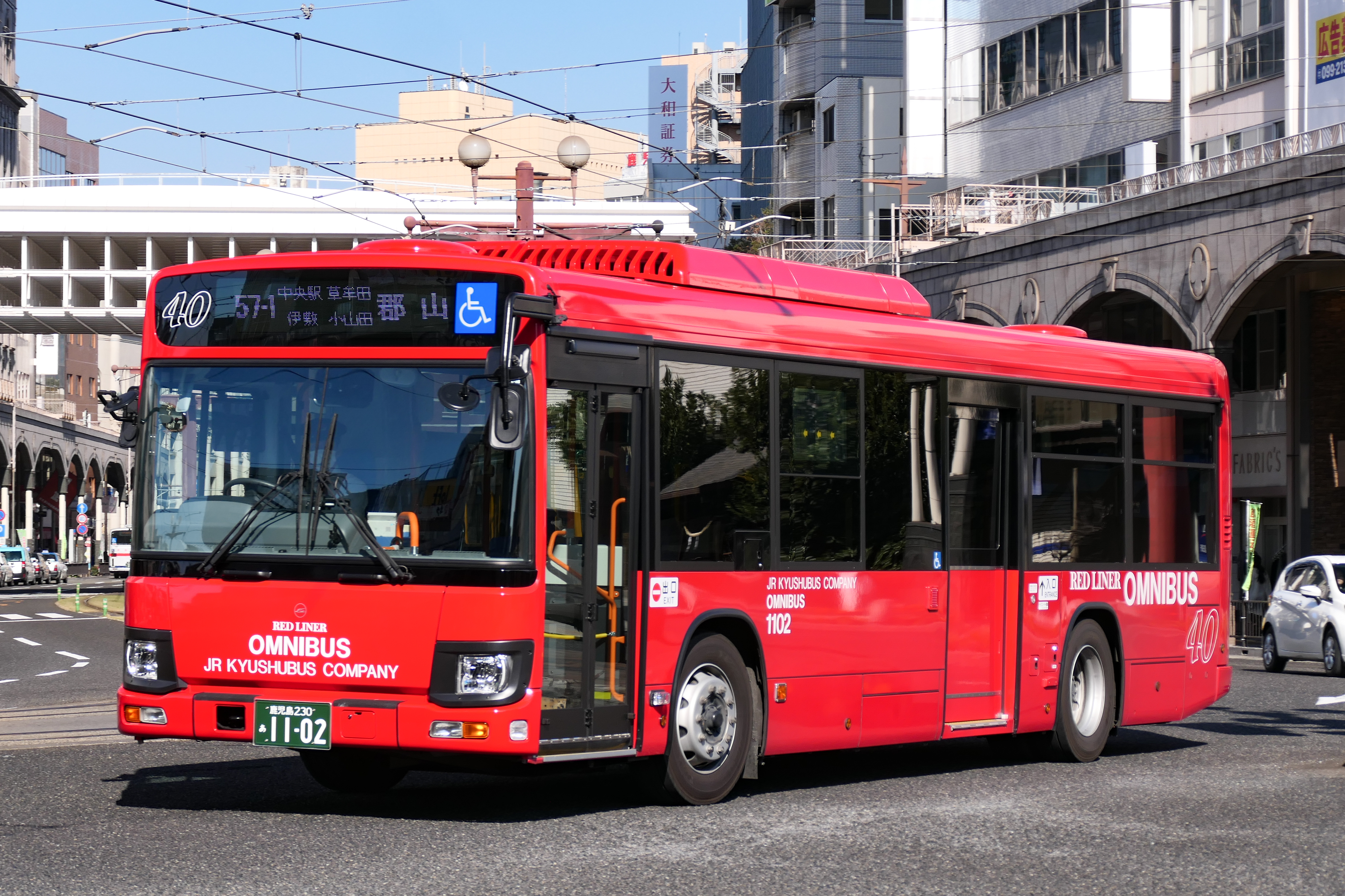
JR Kyushu Bus 521-21602

=== Expressway route vehicles ===
JR Bus Tohoku, JR Bus Kanto, JR Tokai Bus and Chugoku JR Bus share a common livery based on the JNR Bus livery.

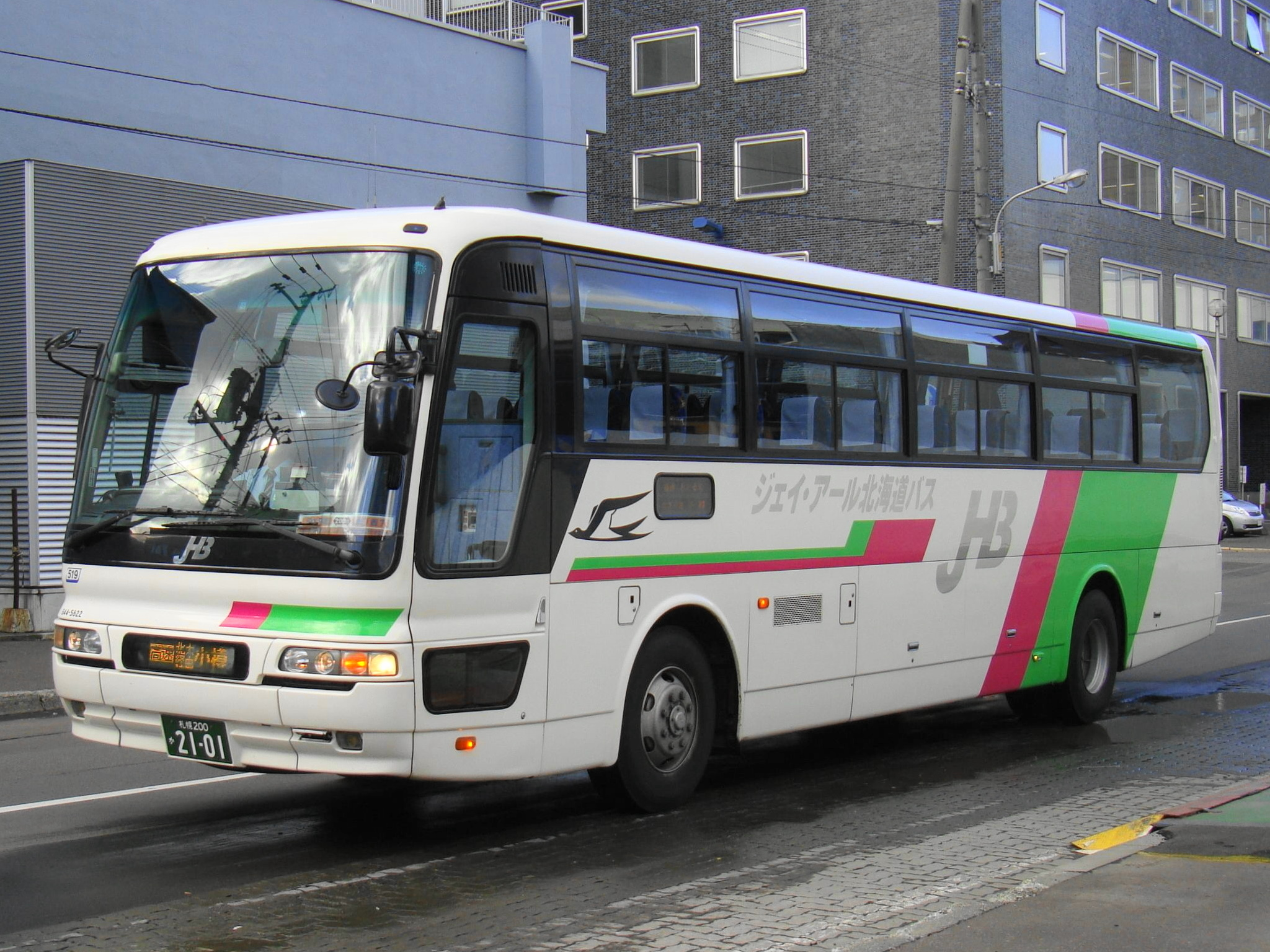
JR Hokkaido Bus 644-5822

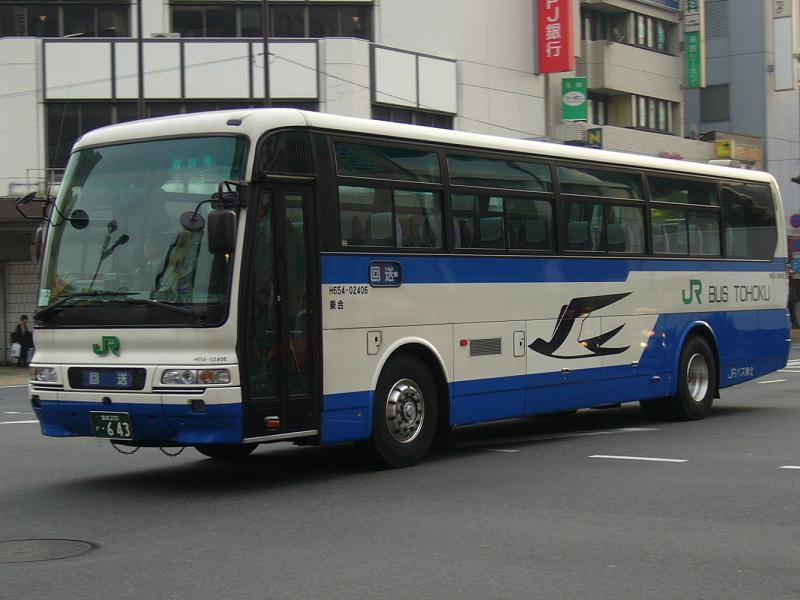
JR Bus Tohoku H654-02406

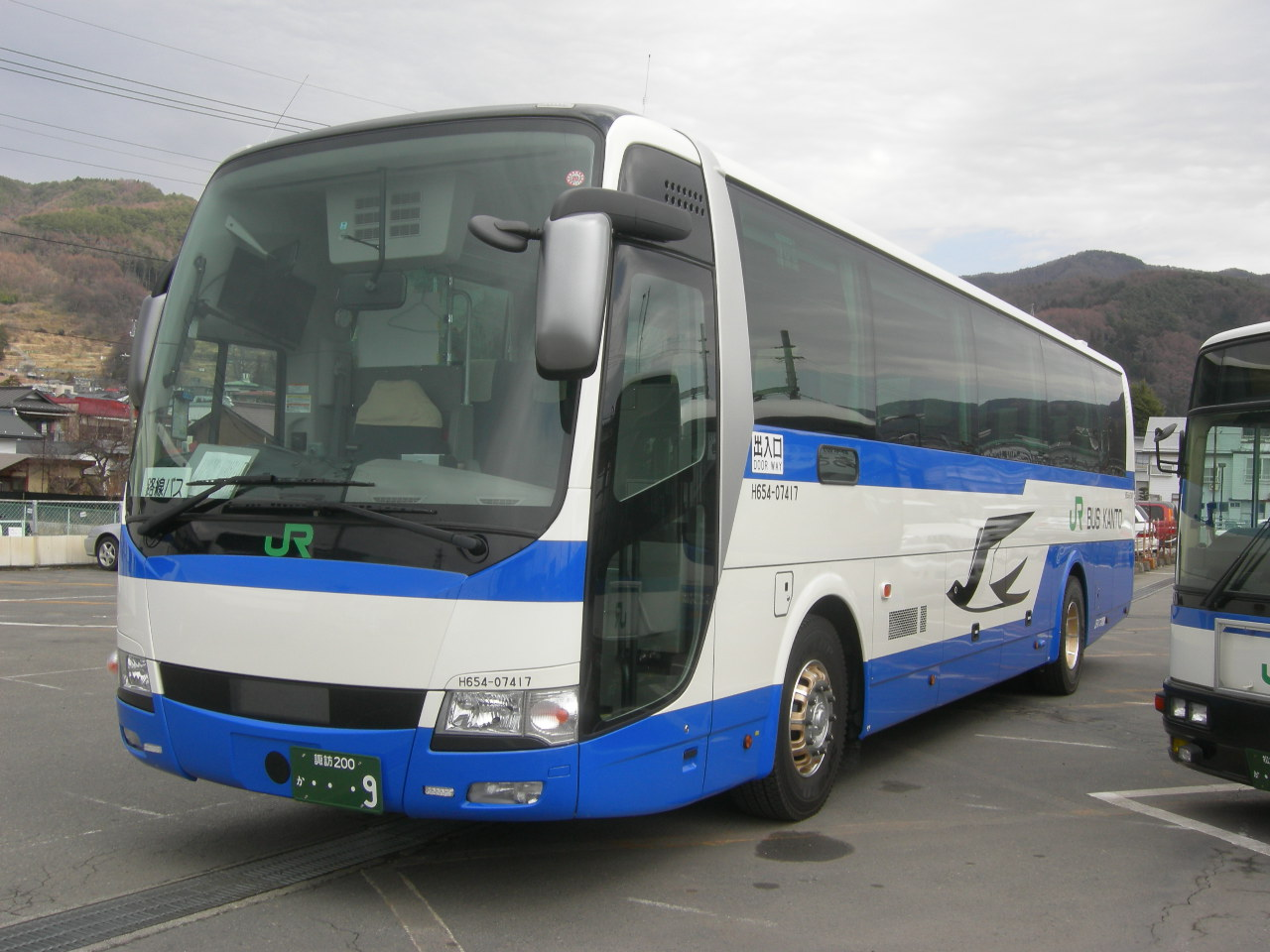
JR Bus Kanto H654-07417

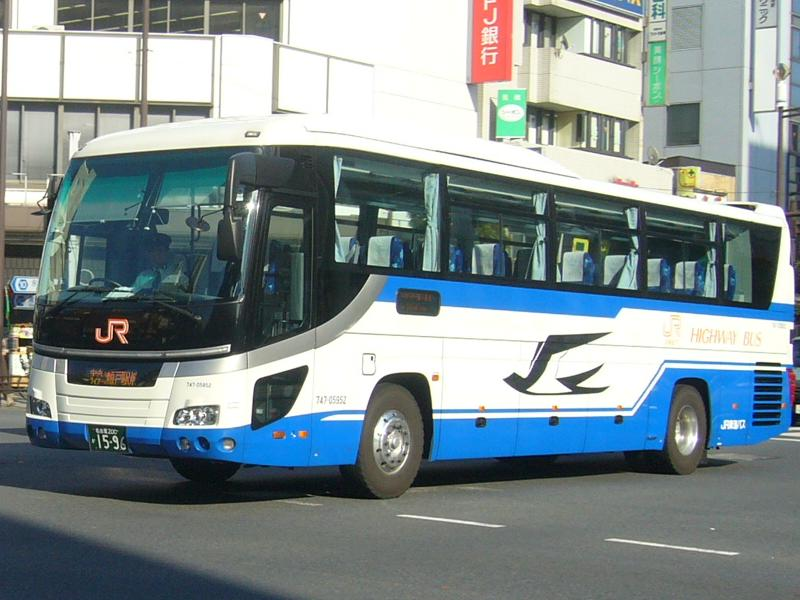
JR Tokai Bus 747-05952

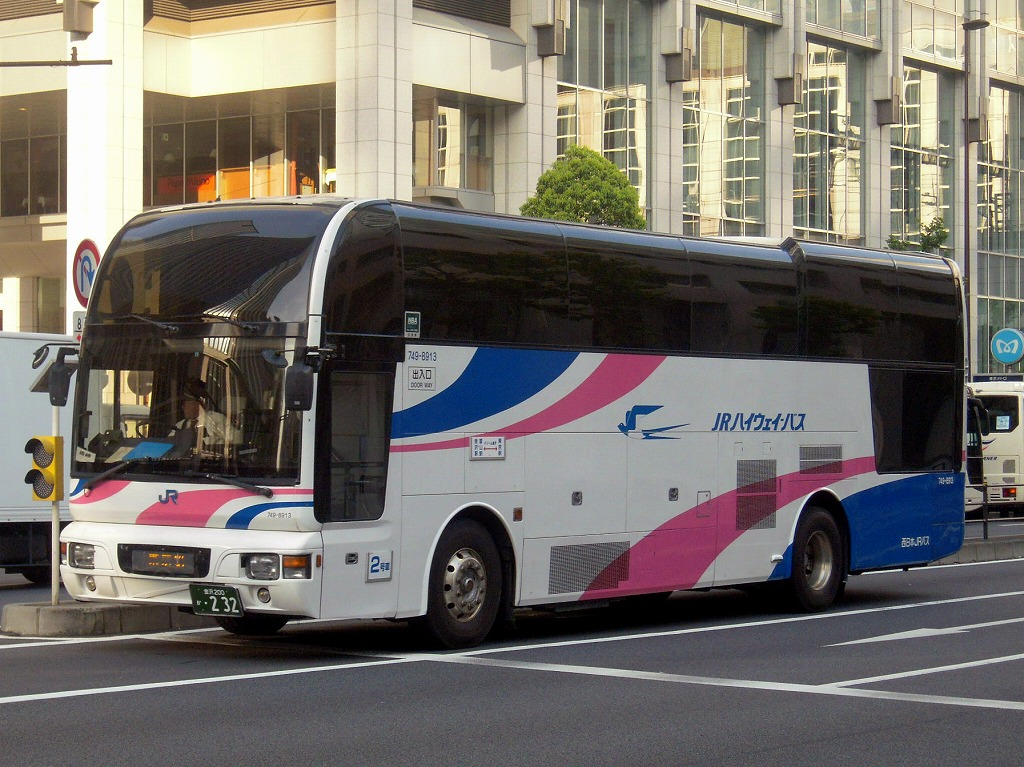
Nishinihon JR Bus 749-8913

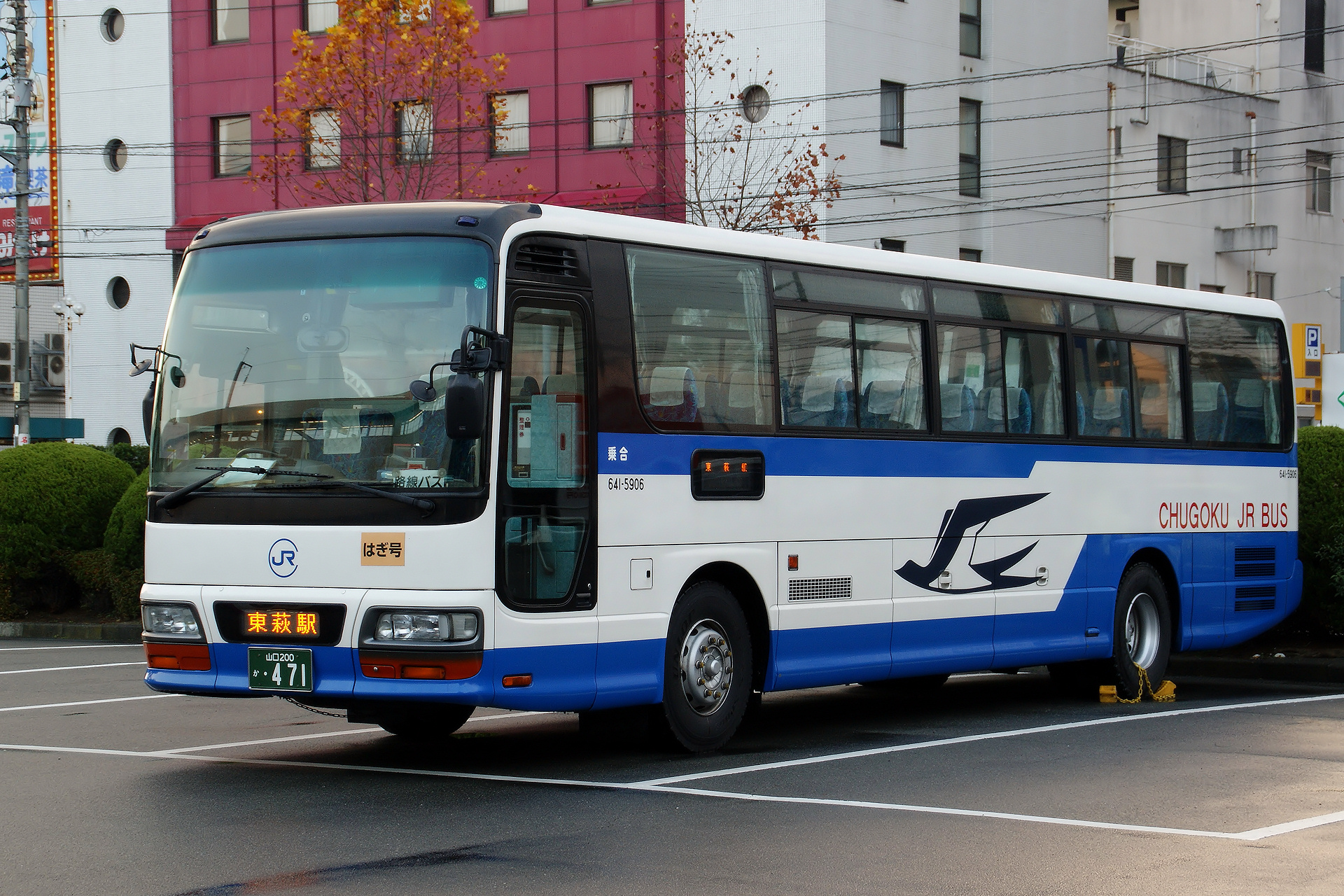
Chugoku JR Bus 641-5906

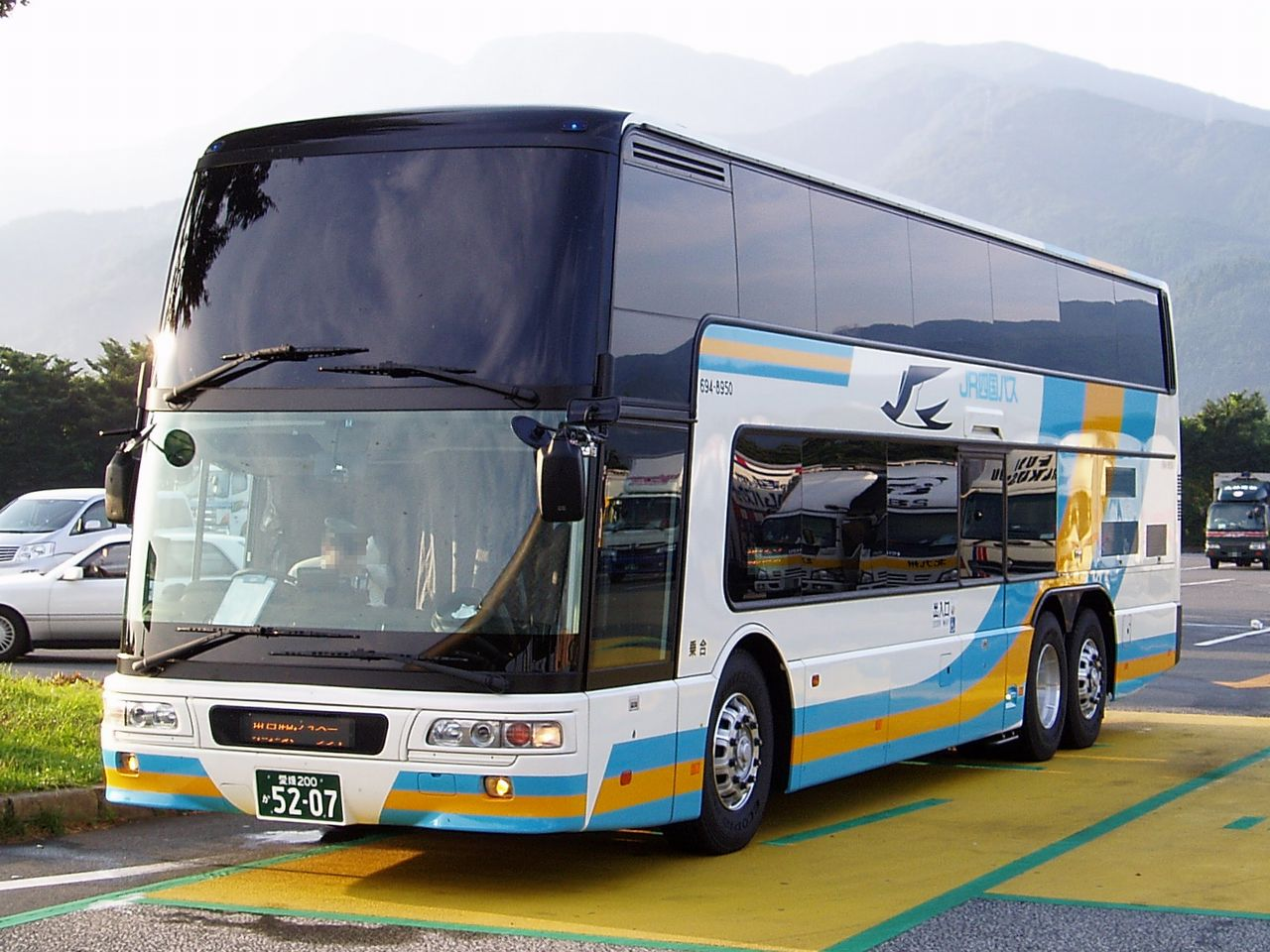
JR Shikoku Bus 694-8950

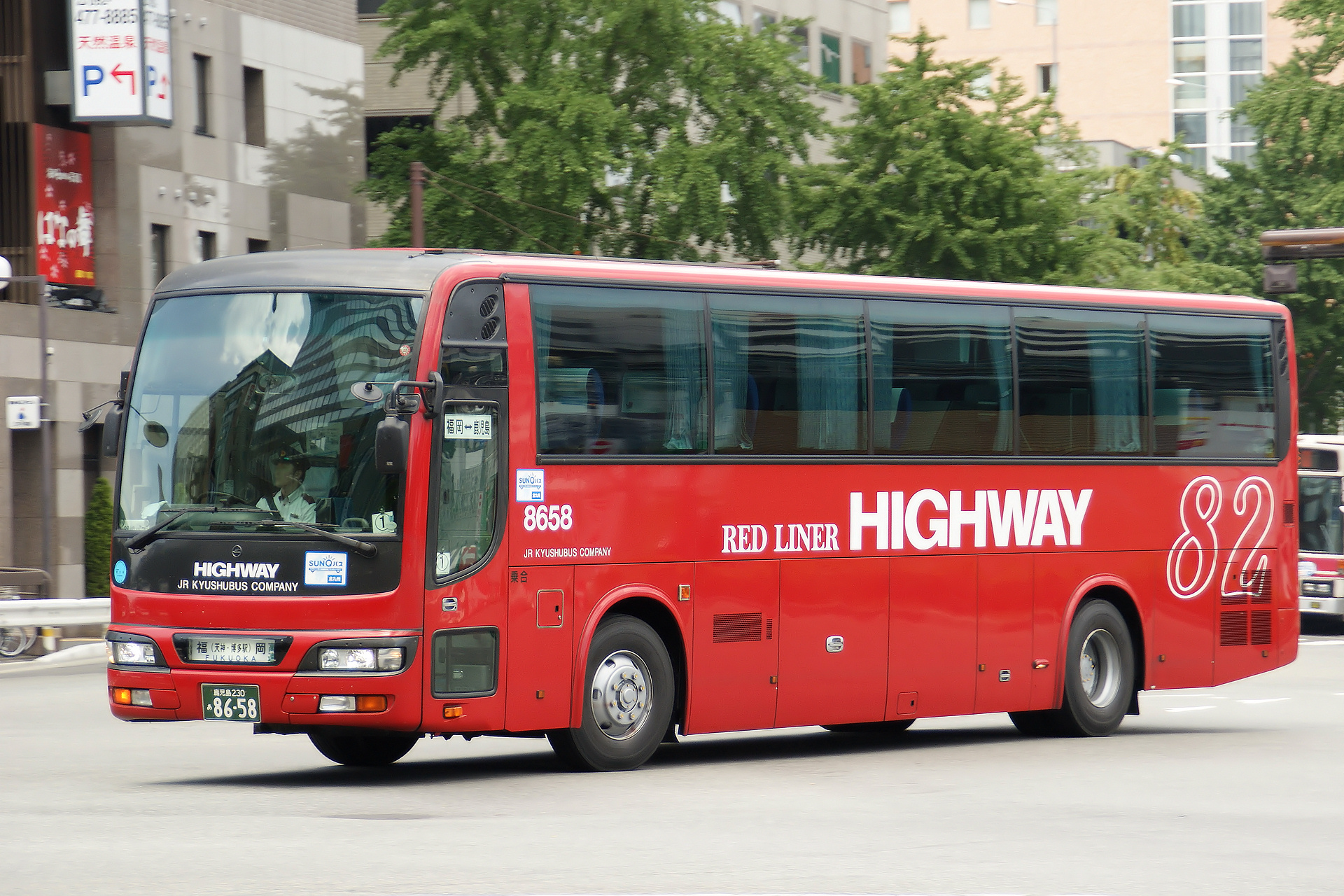
JR Kyushu Bus 748-06558
