= Atre (company) =

Japanese railway station shopping center operator

Atre Co., Ltd.

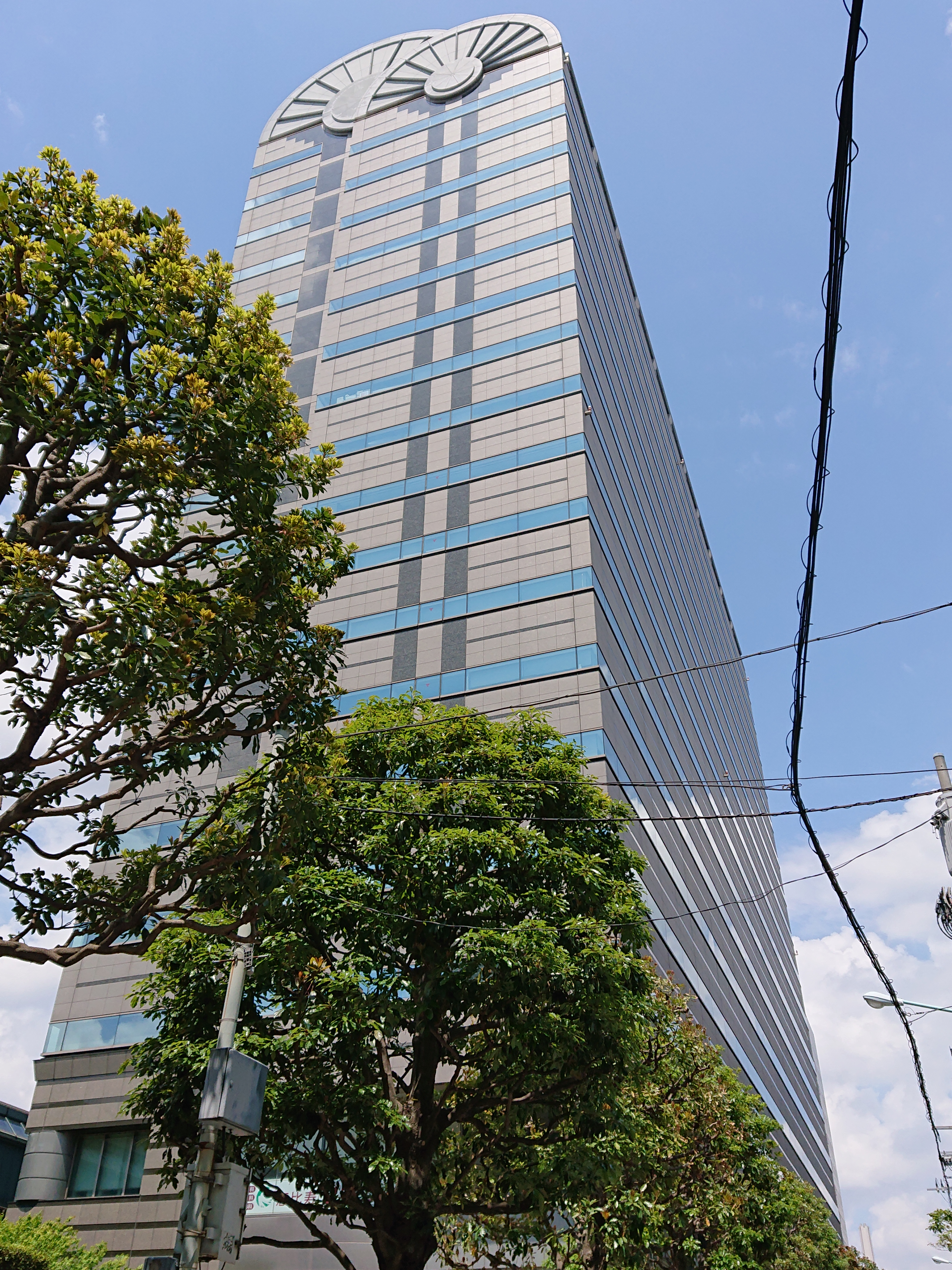
- Ebisu Neonato building, where the company's headquarters is located
- Native name: 株式会社アトレ
- Type: Subsidiary
- Industry: Real estate / Retail
- Founded: April 2, 1990; 36 years ago
- Headquarters: Ebisu, Shibuya, Tokyo, Japan
- Area served: Japan, Taiwan
- Key people: Hiroyuki Takahashi (President)
- Number of employees: 439
- Parent: East Japan Railway Company

Atre Co., Ltd. (株式会社アトレ) is a Japanese company headquartered in Shibuya, Tokyo, that develops and operates station-based shopping centers under the "Atre" (atré) brand in the Tokyo metropolitan area. It is a wholly owned subsidiary of East Japan Railway Company (JR East).

== History ==
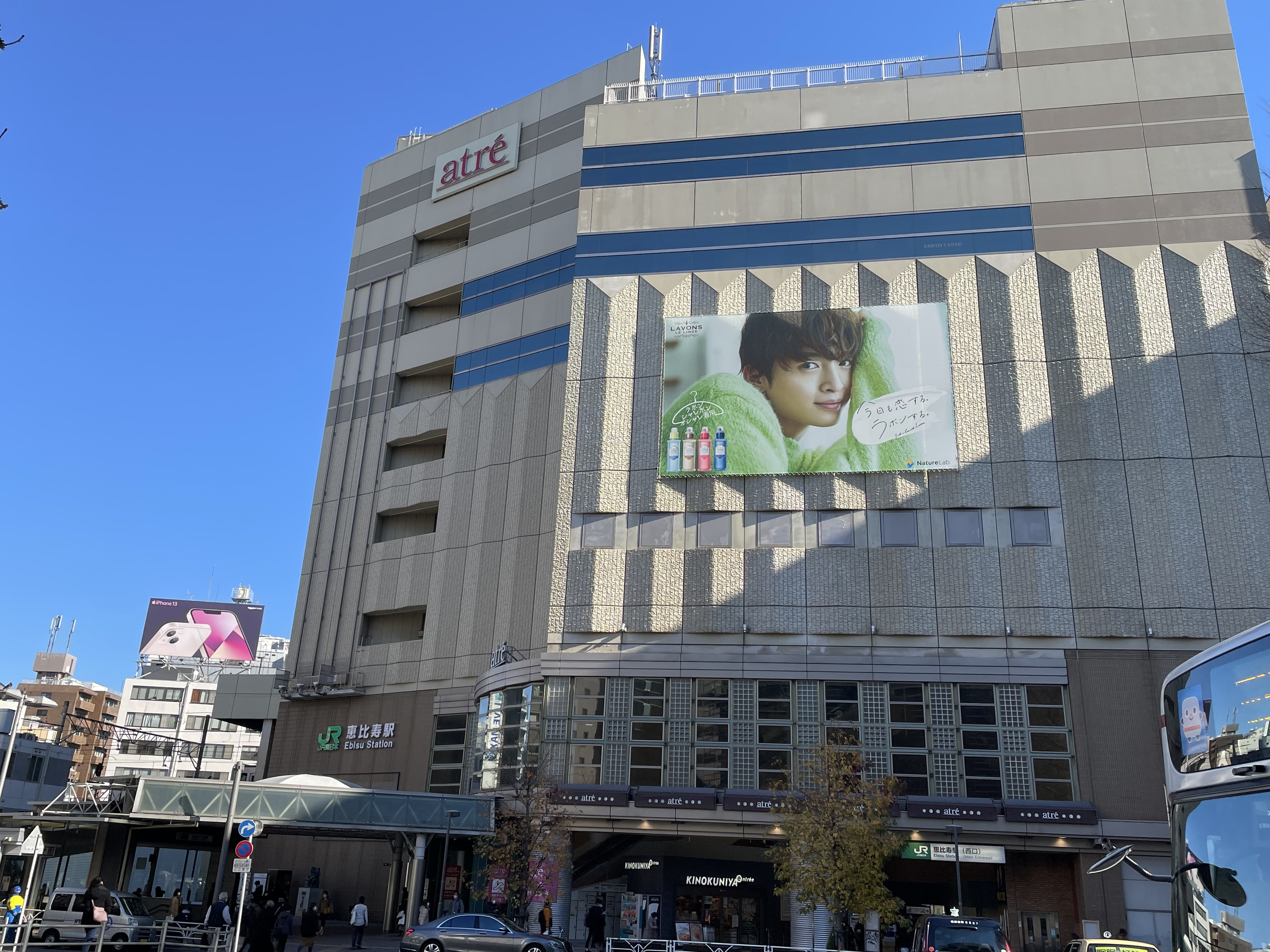
Atre Ebisu, one of the company's flagship shopping centers, in Tokyo (2021)

The company was established on April 2, 1990 as Tokyo Area Station Building Development Co., Ltd., a station building operator within the JR East Group. The name "Atre" is derived from the French word "attrait", meaning "attraction" or "appeal". The company is engaged in the development, management, and operation of shopping centers, primarily located in railway stations.

Its first shopping center, Atre Yotsuya, opened in September of the same year.

Subsequently, additional locations such as Shin-Urayasu and Ōimachi were opened. Beginning with Atre Ebisu, the company introduced a development model focused on comprehensive production and design of station buildings.

In addition to opening new Atre locations, the company also absorbed and renovated existing JR East station buildings, including those at Meguro, Kameido, and Ōmori, converting them into Atre-branded facilities.

In March 2005, the company began operating "Dila Nishi-Funabashi" under a similar development model, and in June of the same year launched the smaller-scale commercial facility brand "Atre Vie" in Akihabara.

== International operations ==
In January 2019, Atre opened its first overseas location in Taipei, Taiwan.

However, the company announced in October 2023 that the store would close in December 2023 due to the expiration of its lease agreement.

In December 2025, Atre announced that its Taiwanese subsidiary, Taiwan JR East Commercial Development Co., Ltd., had been selected as the operator of a commercial facility located on the basement level of Taipei Main Station.

The project, covering approximately 543 square meters, is planned as a food-focused retail zone targeting daily commuters. The company aims to apply its experience in station-based commercial development in Japan to enhance the role of railway stations as lifestyle-oriented spaces.

Taipei Main Station is the largest transportation hub in Taiwan, serving multiple rail systems and handling over 500,000 passengers per day.

== Subsidiaries ==
The company has several subsidiaries, including Atre Style Co., Ltd., Utsunomiya Station Development Co., Ltd., Takasaki Terminal Building Co., Ltd., and Mito Station Development Co., Ltd.
