= Atsubetsu Station =

Railway station in Sapporo, Japan

Coordinates: 43.0452°N 141.4627°E

Atsubetsu Station 厚別駅
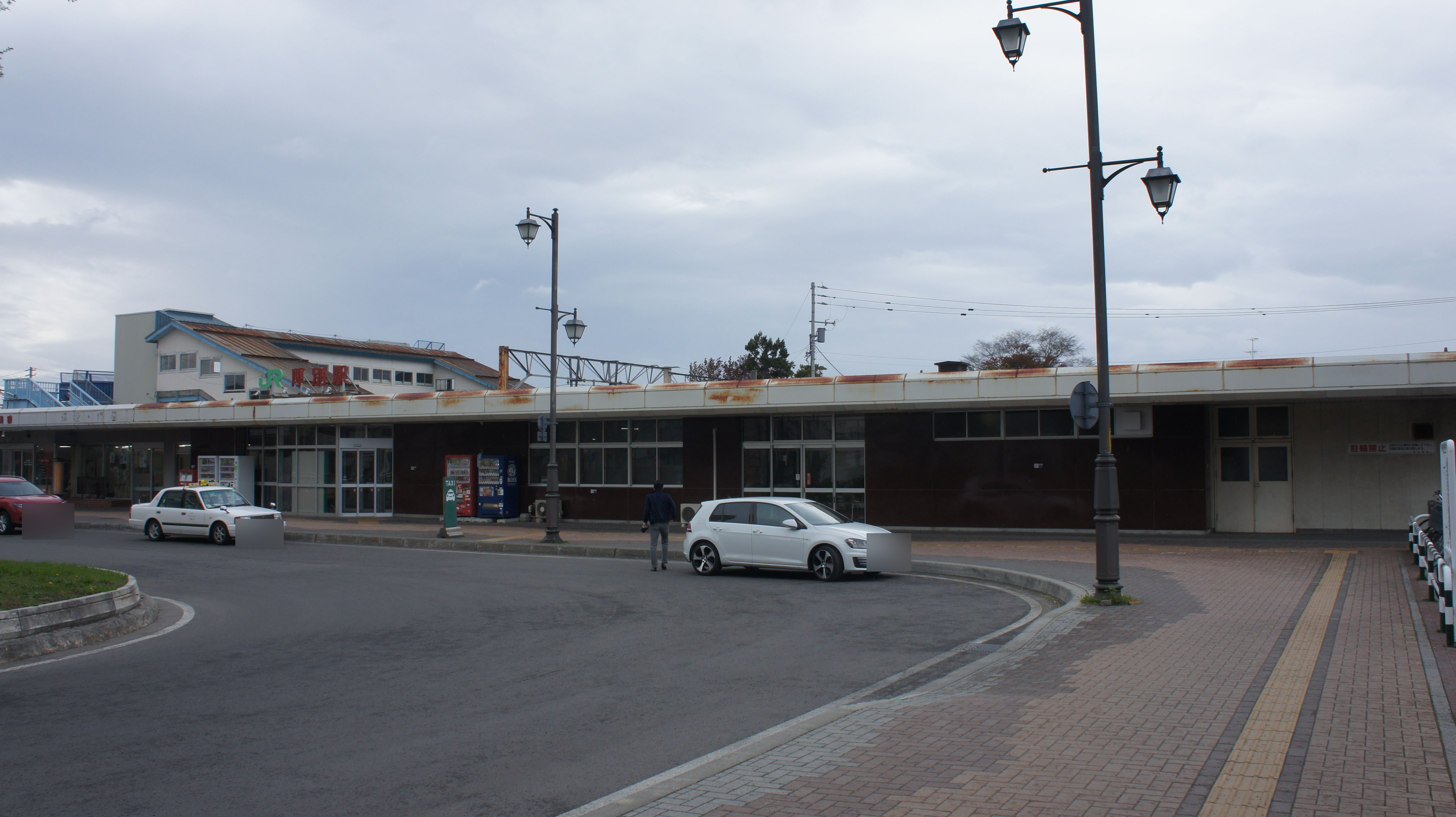
- Station building, May 2017

General information
- Location: Atsubetsu-ku, Sapporo, Hokkaido; Japan
- Operator: JR Hokkaido
- Line: ■ Hakodate Main Line
- Distance: 296.5 km from Hakodate
- Platforms: 1 side + 1 island platforms
- Tracks: 3

Other information
- Status: Staffed
- Station code: A04

History
- Opened: August 1, 1894

Passengers
- FY2014: 3,070 daily

Services
| Preceding station | JR Hokkaido | Following station |
|---|---|---|
| Shiroishi towards Hakodate | Hakodate Main Line | Shinrin-Kōen towards Asahikawa |
Location

Atsubetsu Station (厚別駅, Atsubetsu-eki) is a railway station located in Atsubetsu-ku, Sapporo, Hokkaidō, Japan. The station is numbered A04.

== Lines ==
Atsubetsu Station is served by Hakodate Main Line.

== Station layout ==
The station consists of one side platform and one island platform serving three tracks. The station has automated ticket machines, automated turnstiles which accept Kitaca, and a "Midori no Madoguchi" staffed ticket office.

=== Platforms ===
| 1 | ■ Hakodate Main Line | for Sapporo and Otaru |
| 3-4 | ■ Hakodate Main Line | for Ebetsu and Iwamizawa |

== Adjacent stations ==
| « | Service | » |
Hakodate Main Line
| Shiroishi | Local | Shinrin-Kōen |
Semi-Rapid: Does not stop at this station
Limited Express Sōya: Does not stop at this station
Limited Express Okhotsk: Does not stop at this station

== Surrounding area ==
- Subway Shin-Sapporo Station (Tōzai Line)
- National Route 12 (to Asahikawa)
- Sapporo Ryūtsū Center (AXES Sapporo)
- Atsubetsu-Nishi Post Office
- Shinano Atsubetsu Police Station
- Sapporo City Agricultural Cooperative Association (JA Sapporo), Atsubetsu branch
- Hokumon shinkin Bank Atsubetsu-Nishi branch
