= JR Hokkaido Bus Company =

Operator of inter-city and local bus lines

JR Hokkaido Bus Co., Ltd.
- Native name: ジェイ・アール北海道バス株式会社
- Type: Kabushiki kaisha
- Founded: November 1, 1999
- Headquarters: Chūō-ku, Sapporo, Hokkaido, Japan
- Area served: Hokkaido
- Key people: As of June 21, 2020: Masanobu Tabata, president and CEO Toru Okuyama, managing director Chika Yamauchi, managing director
- Website: www.jrhokkaidobus.com

JR Hokkaido Bus (ジェイ・アール北海道バス株式会社, Jei āru Hokkaidō basu kabushikigaisha) is an operator of inter-city and local bus lines based in Hokkaido, Japan. A wholly owned subsidiary of the Hokkaido Railway Company (JR Hokkaido), JR Hokkaido Bus is one of eight JR Bus companies within the Japan Railways Group (JR Group).

JR Hokkaido Bus operates routes connecting Hokkaido cities, as well as local city services in Sapporo.

== Overview ==
Besides providing bus service inside the city of Sapporo, JR Hokkaido Bus also operates chartered buses. Its central business is transportation between the city center and residential areas, such as Teine and Atsubetsu; with some services starting from the bus terminals at subway stations.

The regional bus routes were originally established to complement the company's railway services, but were subsequently transferred to local carriers following a financial downturn in the company.

=== Business offices ===
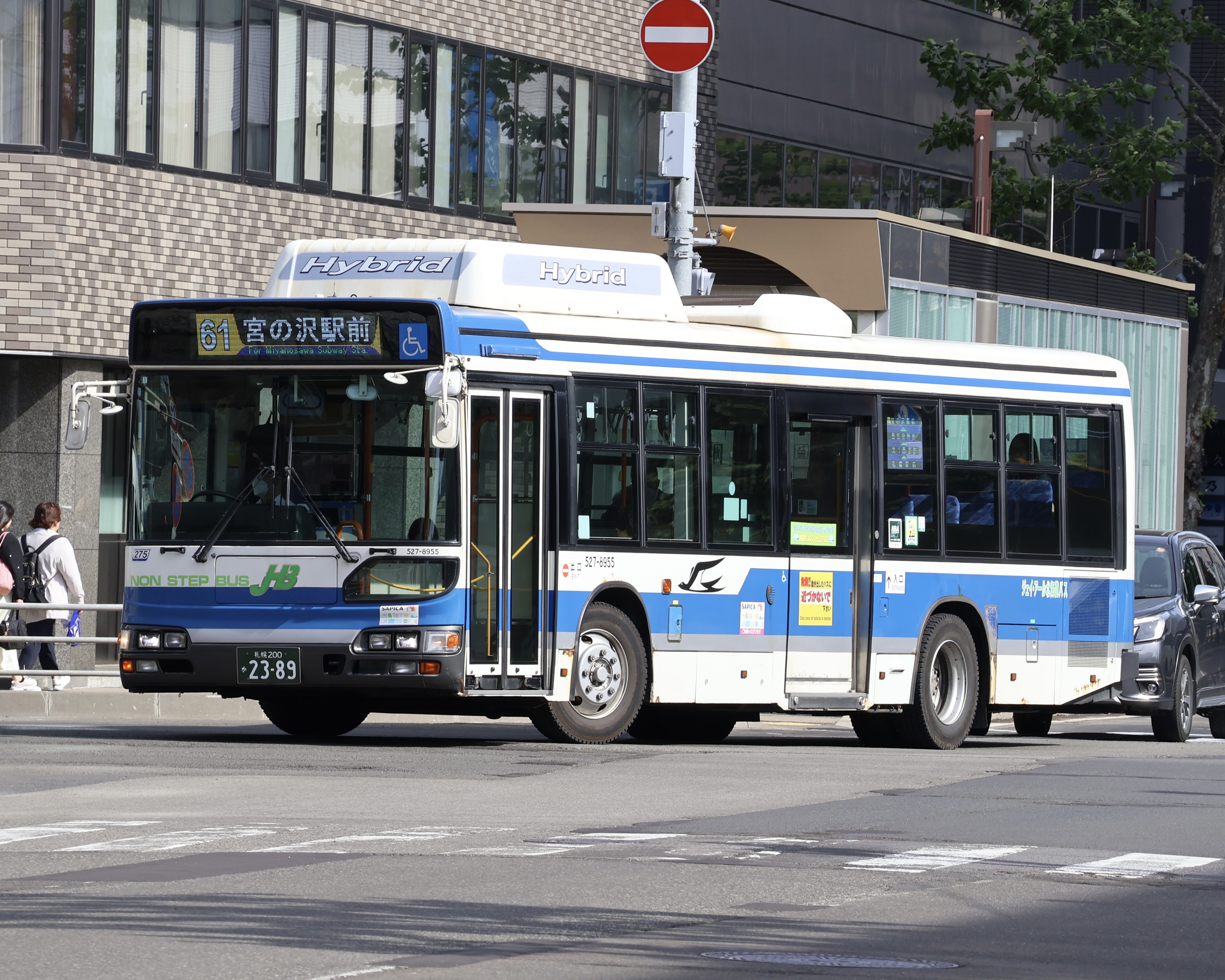
A bus operated by JR Hokkaido Bus in Sapporo

- Sapporo Chuo, Head Office
  - Otaru branch
  - Teine-ku, Sapporo branch
  - Kotoni Sapporo branch
  - Chūō-ku, Sapporo branch
  - Atsubetsu-ku, Sapporo Sales Office
  - Minami Naganuma Sales Office
  - Fukagawa branch
  - Samani branch
  - Teine-ku, Sapporo Maintenance Center
  - Hokkaido Travel Center store Apia
  - Teine Station (Smart Oil Teine stores)
  - Kotoni Station (Smart Oil Kotoni Branch)
  - Atsubetsu Station (Smart Oil Atsubetsu store)

== Highway bus routes ==
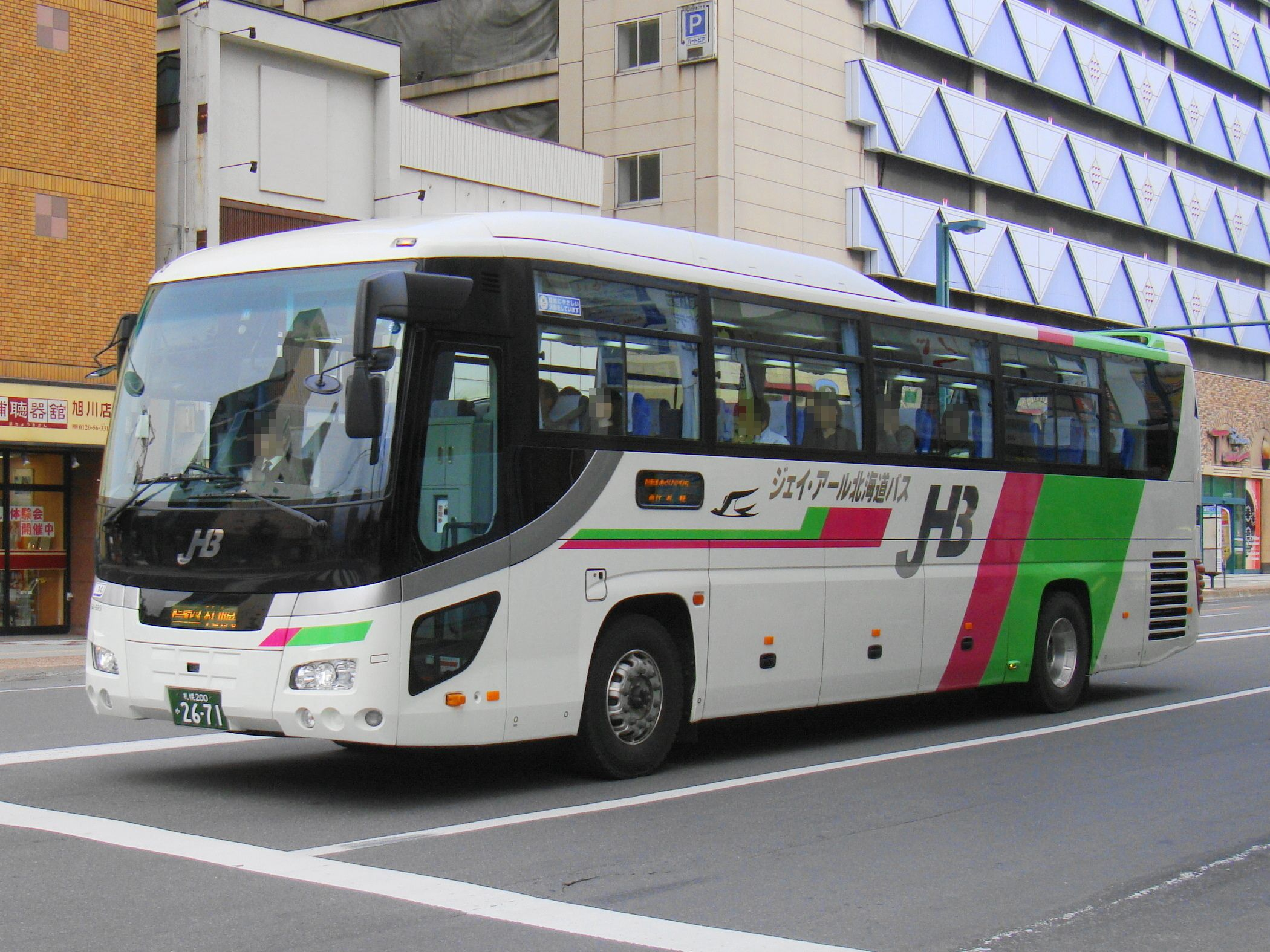
JR Hokkaido Bus Fast Dohoku

- Sapporo - Otaru
- Sapporo - Asahikawa
- Sapporo - Obihiro
- Sapporo - Monbetsu
- Sapporo - Erimo
- Sapporo - Hiroo

== See also ==
- Hokkaido Chuo Bus
