= Hibarigaoka Station (Hokkaido) =

Subway station in Sapporo, Japan

Coordinates: 43°1′56.361″N 141°27′52.42″E

T18 Hibarigaoka Station ひばりが丘駅
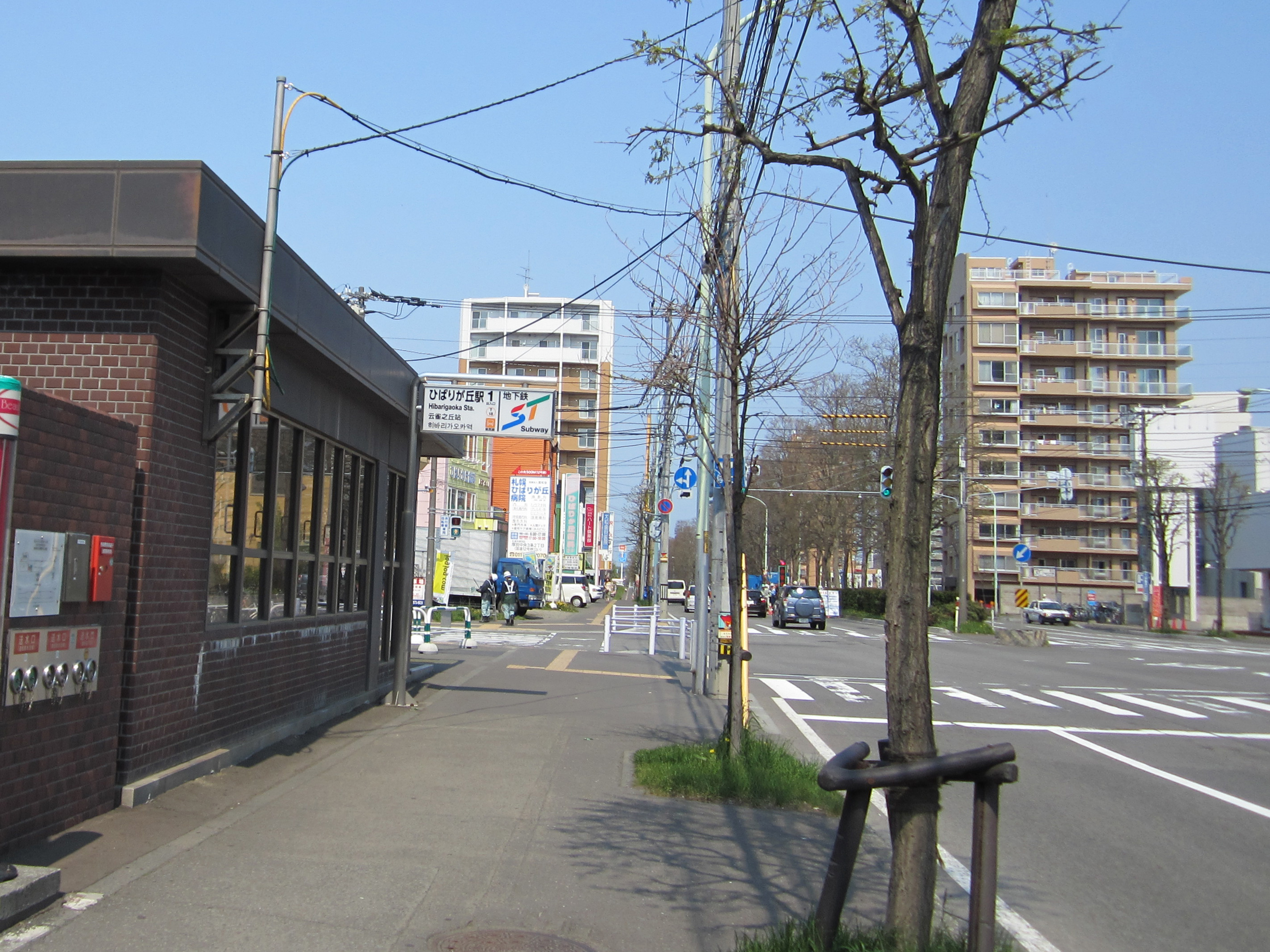
- Entrance No. 1, May 2012

General information
- Location: Atsubetsu, Sapporo, Hokkaido; Japan
- System: Sapporo Municipal Subway station
- Operator: Sapporo City Transportation Bureau
- Line: Tōzai Line

Construction
- Accessible: Yes

Other information
- Station code: T18

History
- Opened: March 21, 1982; 44 years ago

Services
Preceding station	Sapporo Municipal Subway	Following station
Ōyachi T17 towards Miyanosawa	Tōzai Line	Shin-Sapporo T19 Terminus
Location
- Location within Hokkaido Location within Japan

Hibarigaoka Station (ひばりが丘駅, Hibarigaoka-eki) is a Sapporo Municipal Subway station in Atsubetsu-ku, Sapporo, Hokkaido, Japan. The station number is T18. The station has four entrances, with Entrance No. 1 providing the only barrier-free access route via an elevator.

== Platforms ==
1	■ Tōzai Line	for Shin-Sapporo
2	■ Tōzai Line	for Miyanosawa

== History ==
The station opened on 21 March 1982 coinciding with the opening of the Tozai Line extension from Shiroishi Station to Shin-Sapporo Station.

== Gallery ==
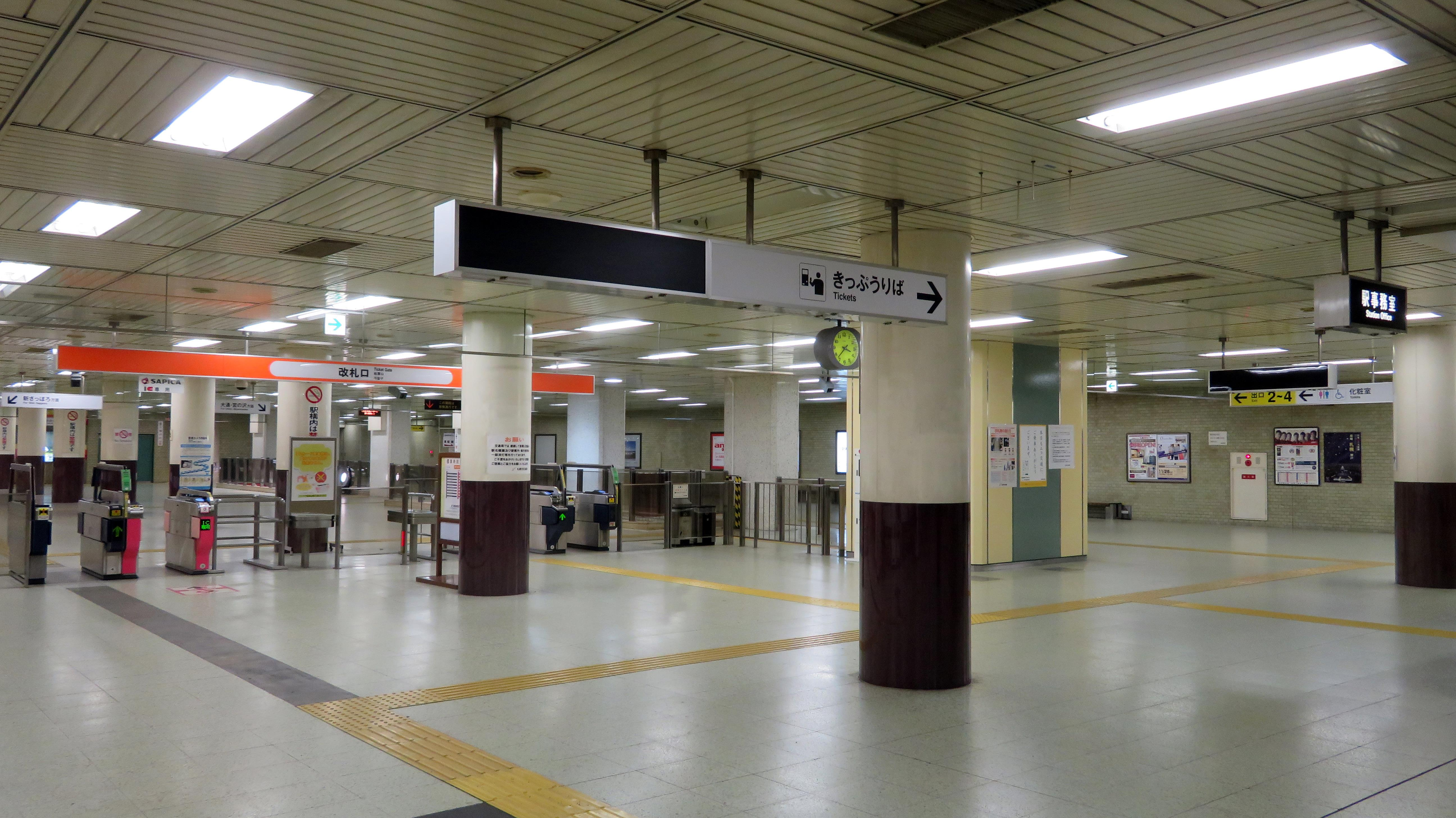
Ticket Gates

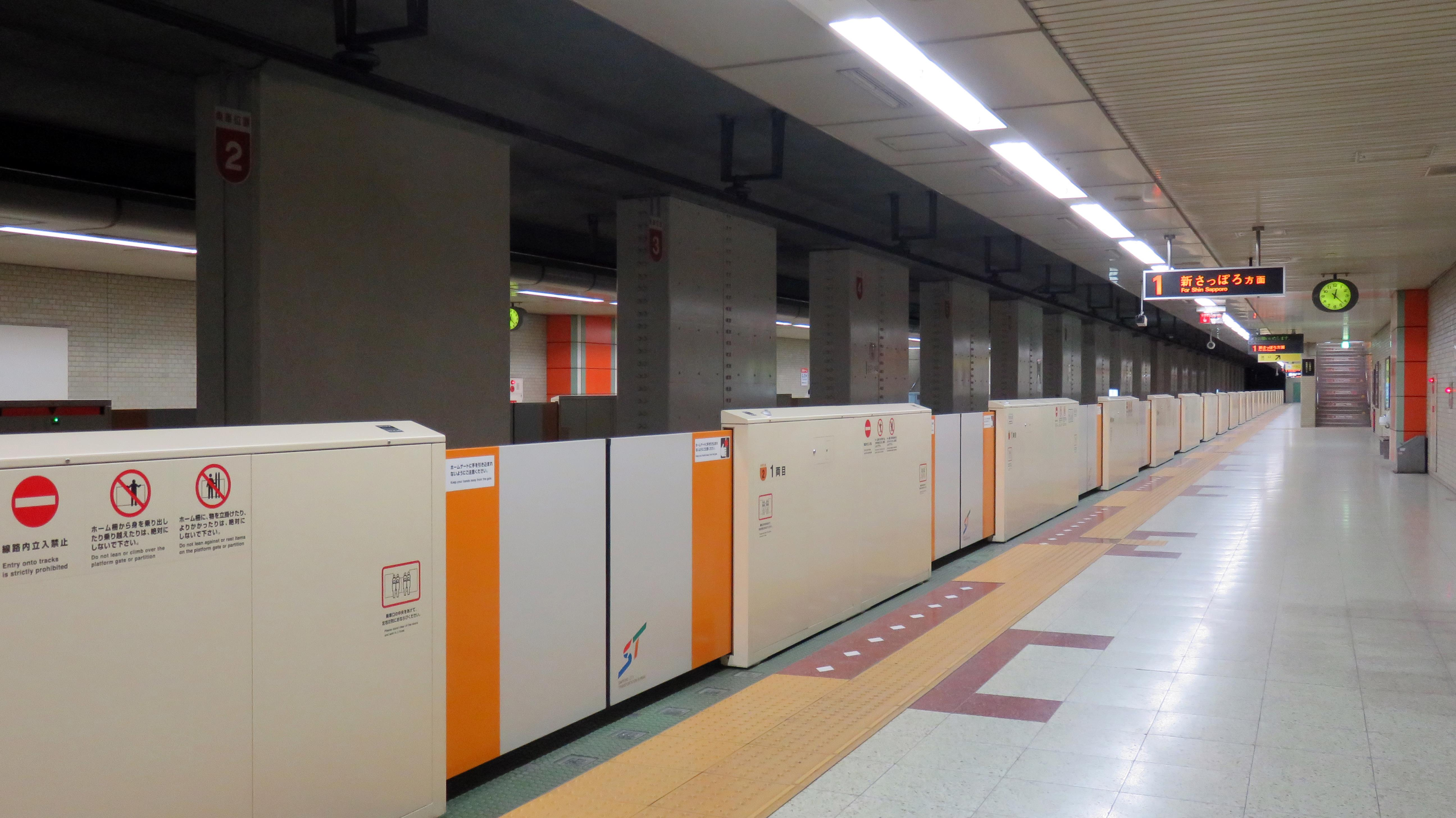
Platform 1

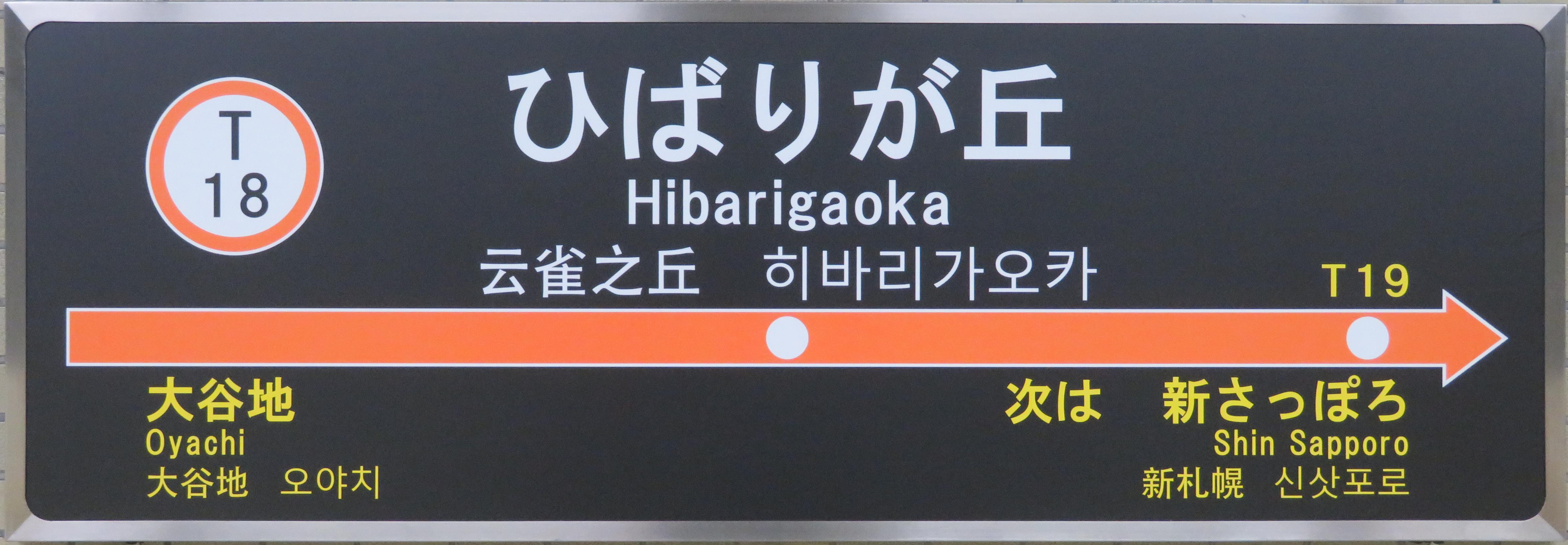
Station signboard
