= Atsubetsu-ku =

Coordinates: 43°2′10″N 141°28′29″E

Atsubetsu 厚別区
- Ward
- Atsubetsu Ward
- Flag Seal

- Location of Atsubetsu-ku in Sapporo
- Country: Japan
- Prefecture: Hokkaidō
- City: Sapporo
- Established: November 6, 1989

Area
  - Total: 24.38 km^{2} (9.41 sq mi)

Population (2009)
  - Total: 129,176
- Estimation as of August 1, 2009
- Time zone: UTC+9 (Japan Standard Time)
- Postal: 004-8612
- Address: 5-3-2 Atsubetsuchuo-ichijo, Atsubetsu-ku, Sapporo-shi, Hokkaido
- Website: Atsubetsu Ward Office

Atsubetsu-ku (厚別区) is one of the ten wards in Sapporo city, Japan. The ward was split from Shiroishi-ku on November 6, 1989.

== History ==
- 1871: Shiroishi village was founded.
- 1873: Kamishiroishi village split off from Shiroishi village.
- 1902: Shiroishi village and kamishiroishi village were merged to form Shiroishi village.
- 1950: Shiroishi village was merged into Sapporo city.
- 1972: Sapporo was designated as one of the cities designated by government ordinance and Shiroishi-ku was established.
- 1989: Atsubetsu-ku split off from Shiroishi-ku.

== Transportation ==
=== Rail ===
- JR Hokkaido
  - Hakodate Main Line: Shinrin-Kōen - Atsubetsu
  - Chitose Line: Shin-Sapporo - Kami-Nopporo
- Sapporo Municipal Subway
  - Tōzai Line: Ōyachi - Hibarigaoka - Shin-Sapporo

=== Road ===
- Dō-Ō Expressway: Sapporo-minami IC
- Route 12

== Education ==
=== University ===
- Hokusei Gakuen University

=== College ===
- Hokusei Gakuen University Junior College

=== High schools ===
==== Public ====
- Hokkaido Sapporo Atsubetsu High School
- Hokkaido Sapporo Keisei High School
- Hokkaido Sapporo Higashi Commercial High School

==== Private ====
- Hokusei Gakuen University High School

== Mascot ==
Pikat-kun, the ward's mascot

Atsubetsu's mascot is Pikat-kun (ピカットくん, Pikatto-kun) who is a scarecrow. It resides in Nopporo Forest Park since its discovery on February 4, 2005. It loves to play children in any occasions like festivals and eat festival food. Its favourite colours are yellow, green and blue because they relate to the bright city and its rich nature and clear skies. Its gender and age is still unknown. It is designed by Kumiko Isobata and Nakade Wakana.

== See also ==
- Nopporo Shinrin Kōen Prefectural Natural Park
- Sapporo Atsubetsu Park Stadium
