= Sapporo =

City in Hokkaido, Japan

Sapporo 札幌市 サッ・ポロ・ペッ(Ainu) Sat Poro Pet
- Prefecture capital and Designated city
- City of Sapporo
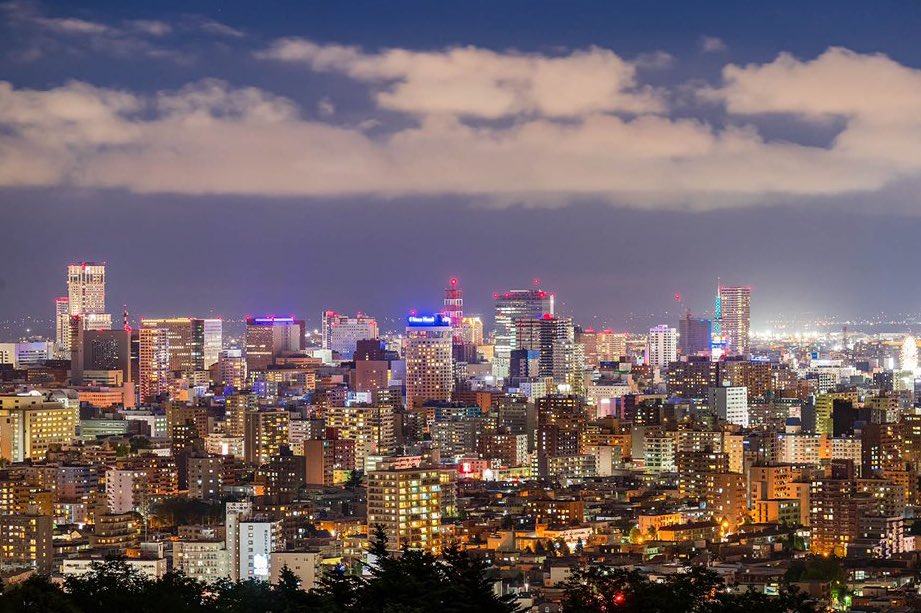
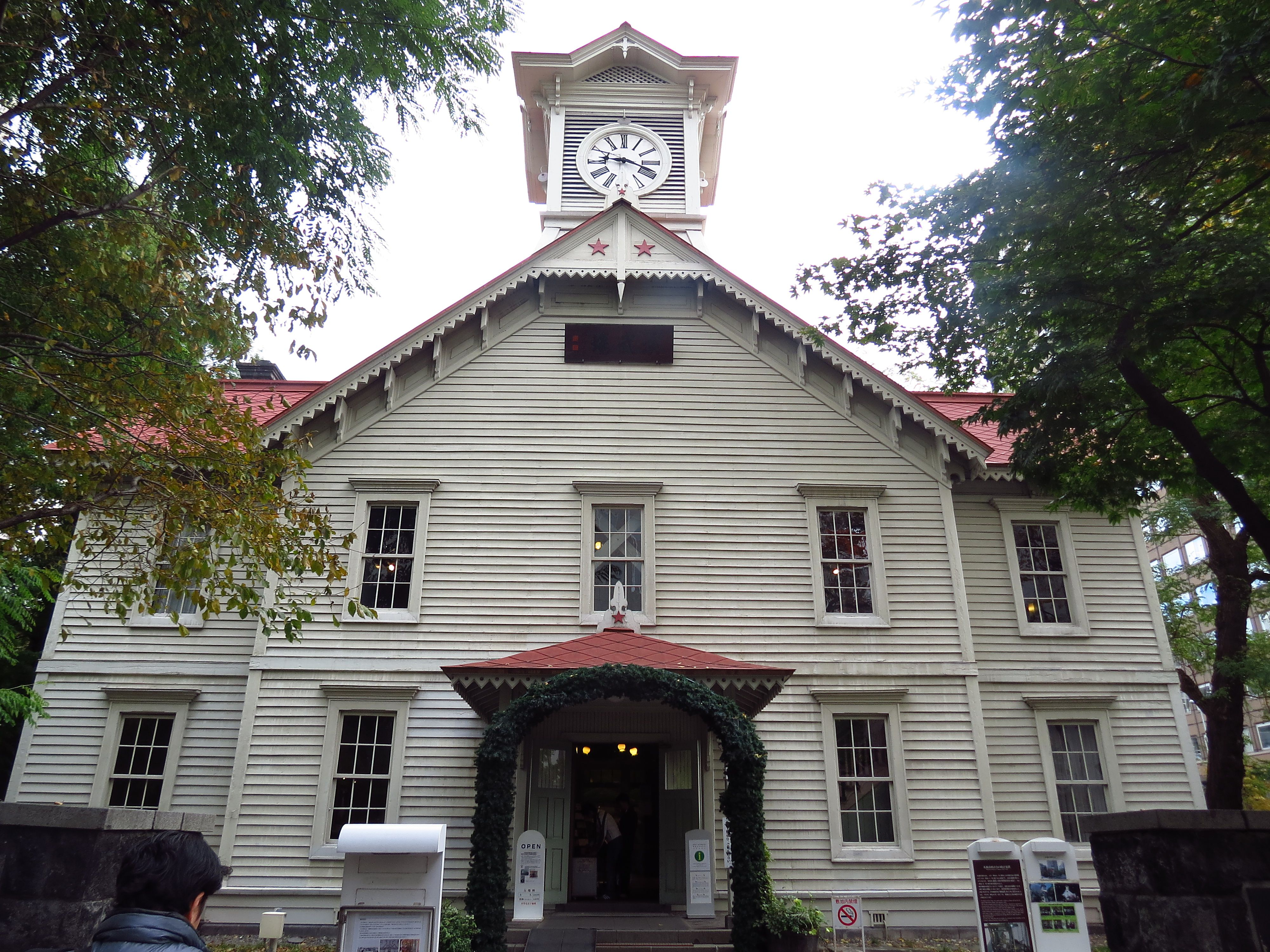
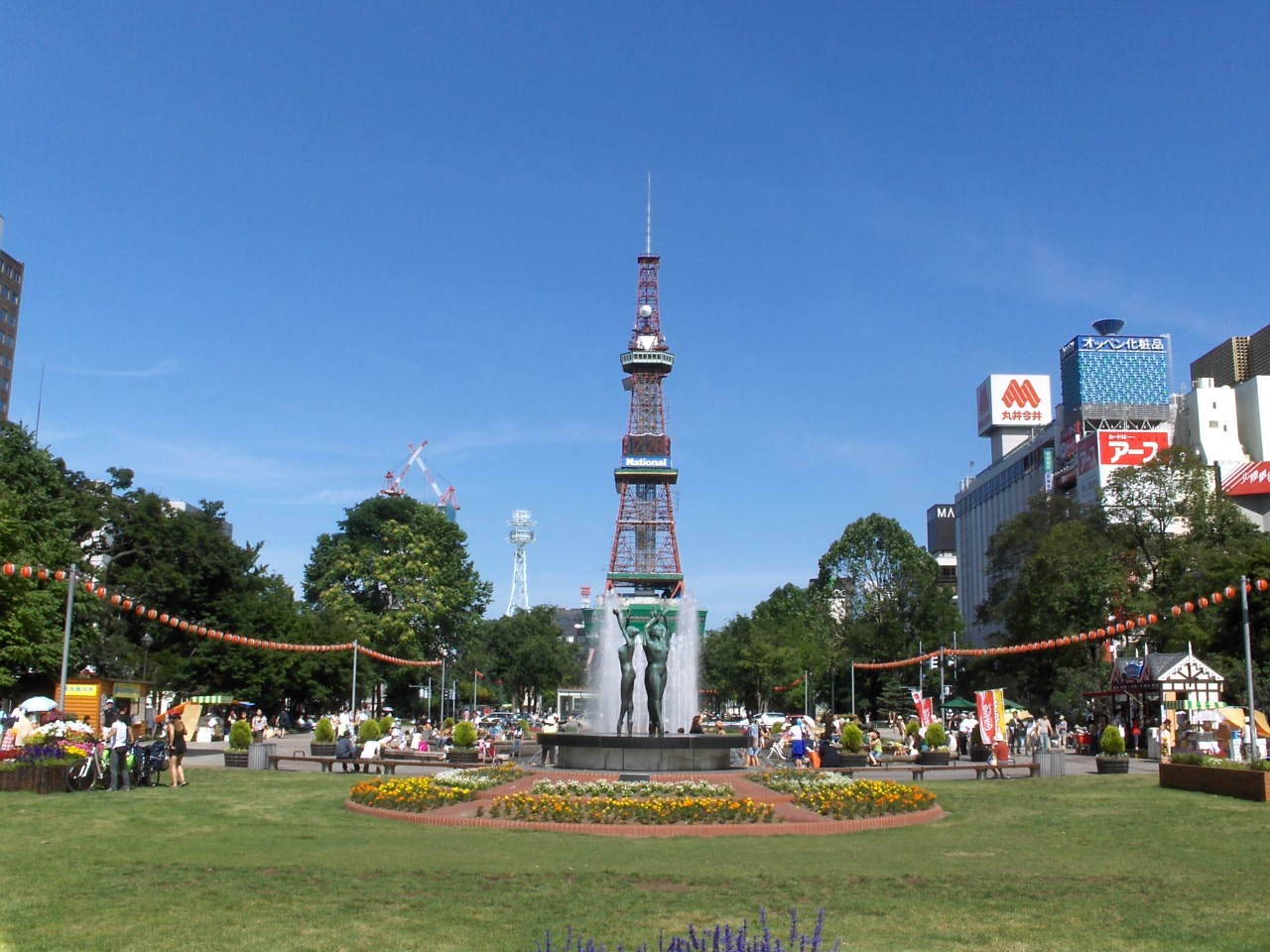
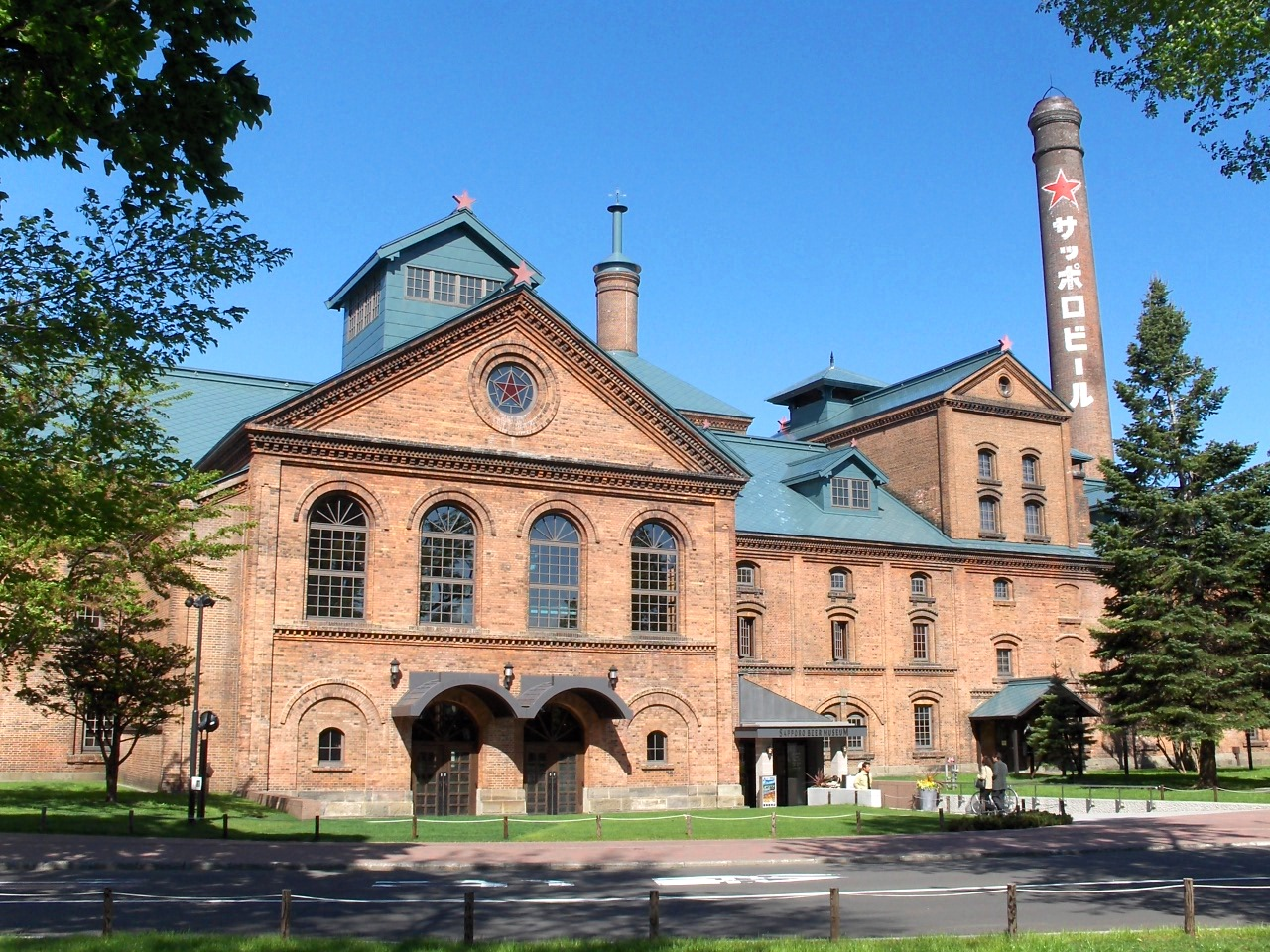
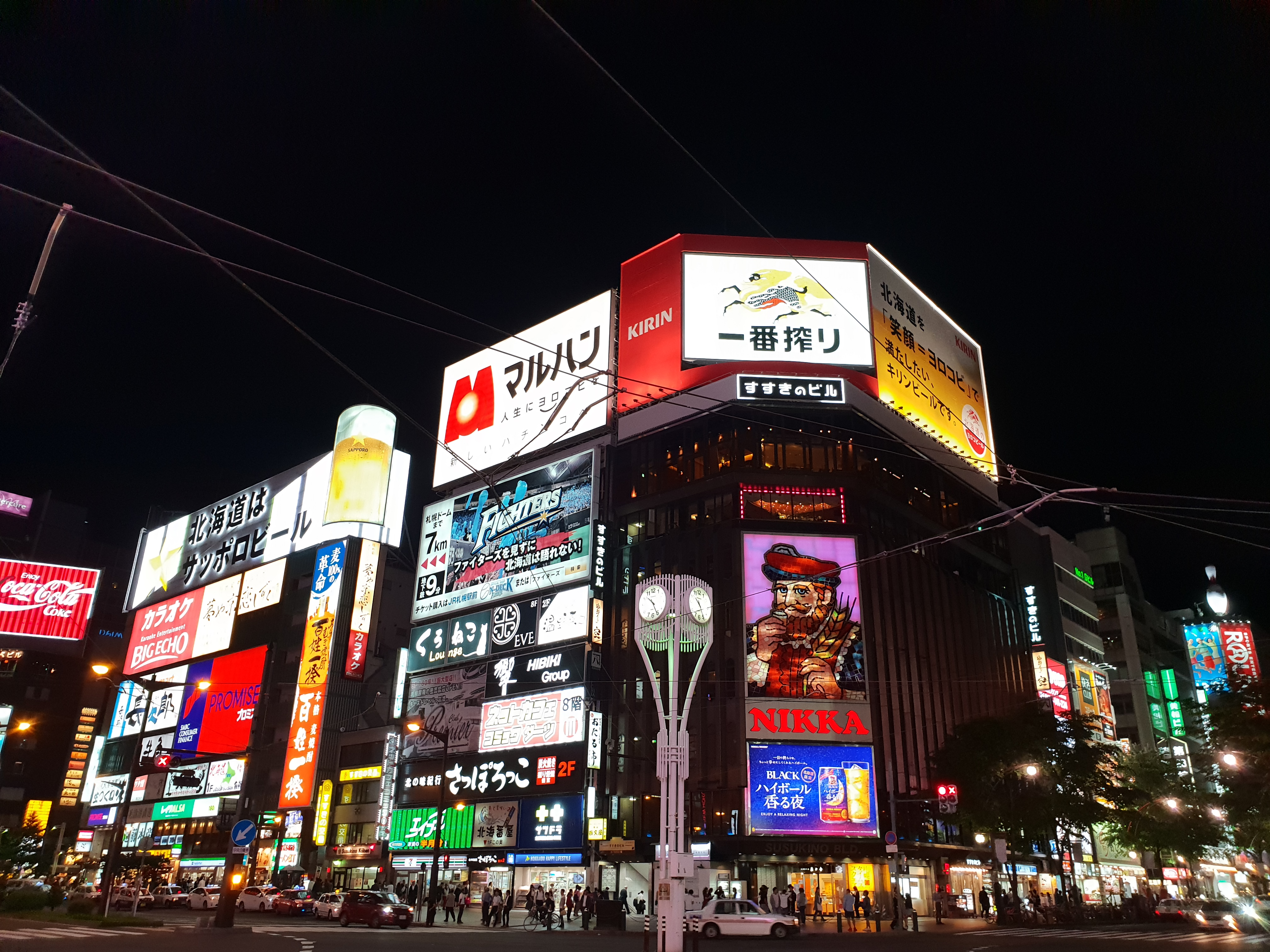
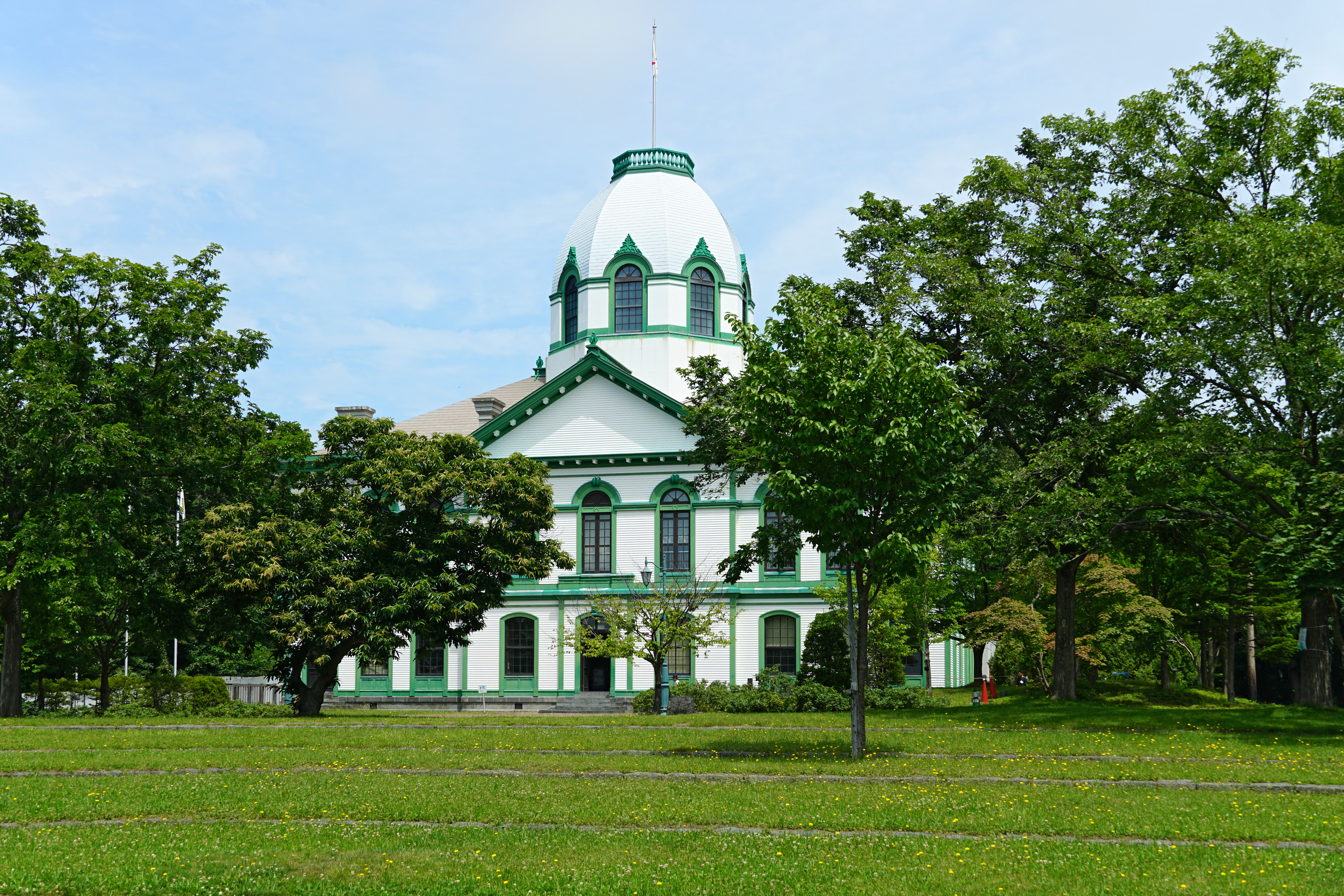
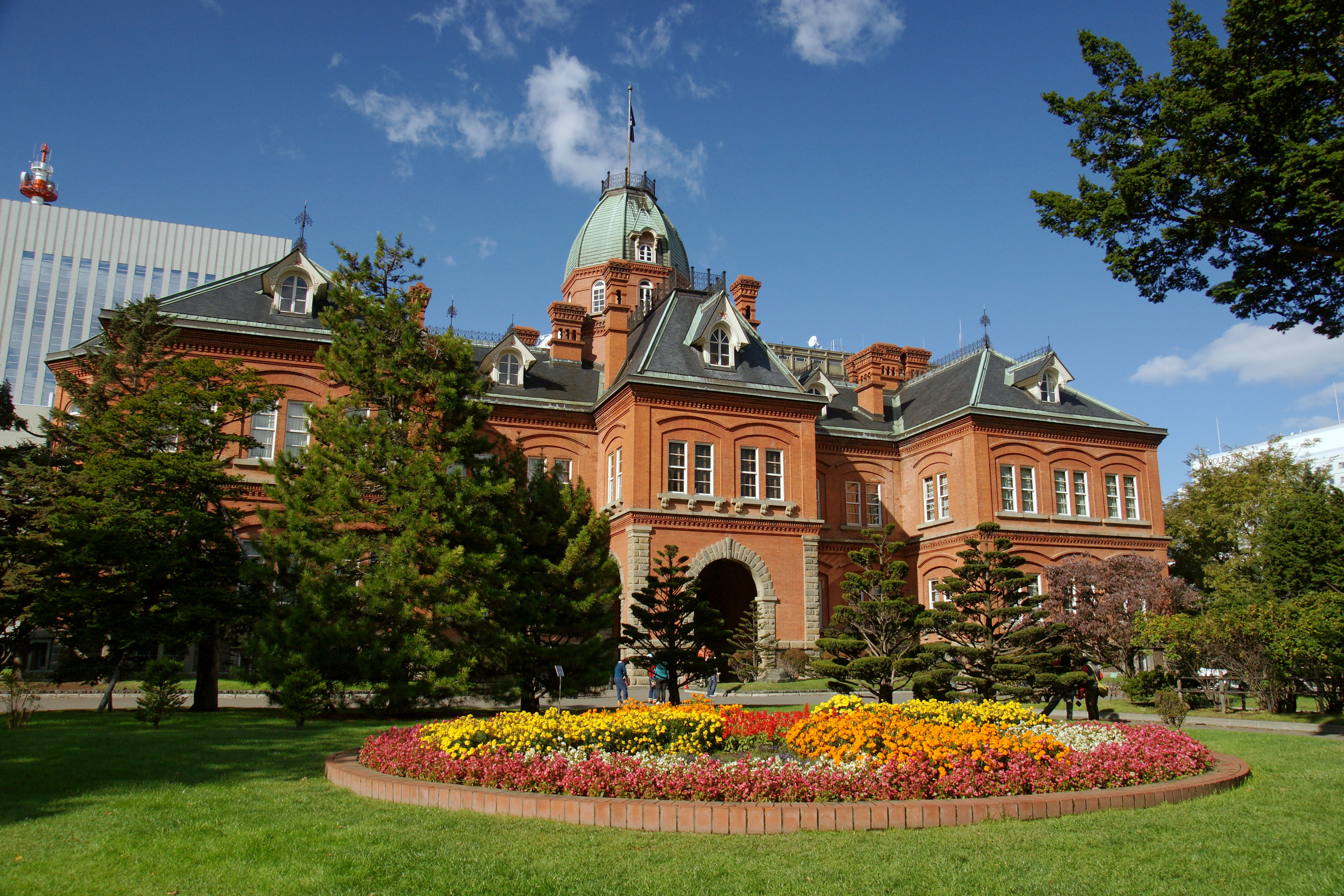
- Sapporo skyline from Asahiyama Memorial Park Sapporo Clock Tower Sapporo TV Tower in Odori Park Sapporo Beer Museum Susukino area Historical Village of Hokkaido Former Hokkaidō Government Office

- Flag Seal
- Interactive map outlining Sapporo
- Location in Japan
- Coordinates: 43°03′43″N 141°21′16″E
- Country: Japan
- Region: Hokkaido
- Prefecture: Hokkaido (Ishikari Subprefecture)
- Establishment of the Hokkaidō Development Commission in Sapporo: 1869
- Granted city status: 1922
- Founder: Shima Yoshitake

Government
  - Mayor: Katsuhiro Akimoto

Area
  - Prefecture capital and Designated city: 1,121.26 km^{2} (432.92 sq mi)

Population (2025)
  - Prefecture capital and Designated city: 1,964,034
  - Estimate (2026): 2,066,420
  - Rank: 5th in Japan
  - Density: 1,751.63/km^{2} (4,536.70/sq mi)
  - Urban: 2,646,000
  - Metro: 2,650,000
- Time zone: UTC+09:00 (JST)
- City hall address: 2-1-1 Kita-ichijō-nishi, Chūō-ku, Sapporo-shi, Hokkaido; 060-8611
- Climate: Dfa
- Website: www.city.sapporo.jp/city/english
- Symbols
- Bird: Common cuckoo
- Flower: Lily of the valley
- Tree: Lilac

Sapporo
- "Sapporo" in kanji

Japanese name
- Kanji: 札幌
- Hiragana: さっぽろ
- Katakana: サッポロ
Transcriptions
- Romanization: Sapporo

Sapporo (Note: Japanese: 札幌市, Hepburn: Sapporo-shi; [sä̀p̚.pó̞.ɾó̞(.ɕì)]; English: /sə.ˈpɔː.roʊ, sæ-/) is a designated city in Hokkaido, Japan. Located in the southwest of Hokkaido, it lies within the alluvial fan of the Toyohira River, a tributary of the Ishikari River. Sapporo is the capital of Hokkaido Prefecture and Ishikari Subprefecture. As of August 1, 2026, the city has a population of 1,962,596, making it the largest city in Hokkaido and the largest north of Tokyo. It is the fifth-most populous city in Japan and is Hokkaido's cultural, economic, and political center.

Originally a plain sparsely inhabited by the indigenous Ainu people, the area contained a few trade posts of the Matsumae domain during the Edo period. The city began as an administrative centre with the establishment of the Hokkaido Development Commission headquarters in 1869. Inspired by the ancient cities of Kyoto and Heijō-kyō, it adopted a grid plan and developed around Odori Park. After World War II, it replaced Otaru as Hokkaido's commercial hub, and its population surpassed one million by 1970.

After being unable to host the 1940 Winter Olympics due to World War II, Sapporo hosted the 1972 Winter Olympics, the first Winter Olympics ever held in Asia, and the second Olympic Games held in Asia after the 1964 Summer Olympics in Tokyo. The Sapporo Dome hosted three matches during the 2002 FIFA World Cup and two matches during the 2019 Rugby World Cup. Additionally, Sapporo has hosted the Asian Winter Games three times, in 1986, 1990, and 2017, and also hosted the 1991 Winter Universiade.

The annual Sapporo Snow Festival draws more than 2 million tourists. Other notable sites include the Sapporo Beer Museum and the Sapporo TV Tower located in Odori Park. It is home to Hokkaido University, just north of Sapporo Station. The city is served by Okadama Airport and New Chitose Airport in nearby Chitose.

== Toponomy ==
Sapporo's name is taken from Ainuic sat poro pet (サッ・ポロ・ペッ), which can be translated as 'dry, great river', a reference to the Toyohira River.

== History ==
=== Early history ===
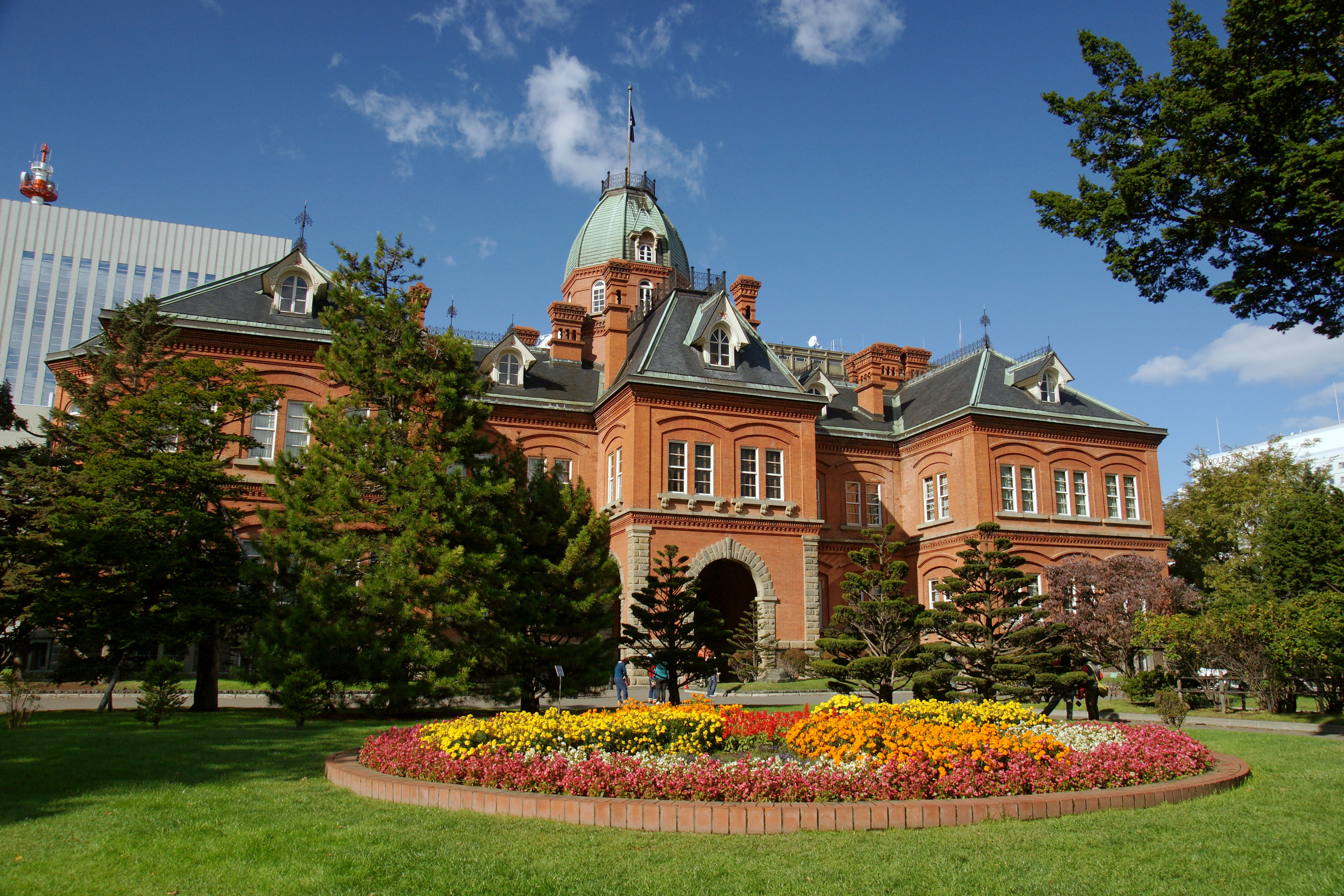
Former Hokkaido Government Office, built in 1888

Before its establishment, the area occupied by Sapporo (Ishikari Plain, around Ishikari, Hokkaido) was home to indigenous Ainu settlements. In 1866, at the end of the Edo period, construction began on a canal through the area, encouraging several early settlers to establish Sapporo village. In 1868, the officially recognized year celebrated as the "birth" of Sapporo, the new Meiji government concluded that the existing administrative center of Hokkaido, which at the time was the port of Hakodate, was in an unsuitable location for defense and further development of the island. As a result, it was determined that a new capital on the Ishikari Plain should be established. The plain itself provided an unusually large expanse of flat, well-drained land, which is relatively uncommon in the otherwise mountainous geography of Hokkaido.

During 1870–1871, Kuroda Kiyotaka, vice-chairman of the Hokkaido Development Commission (Kaitaku-shi), approached the American government for assistance in developing the land. As a result, Horace Capron, Secretary of Agriculture under President Ulysses S. Grant, became an oyatoi gaikokujin and was appointed as a special advisor to the commission. Construction began around Odori Park, which remains as a green ribbon of recreational land bisecting the central area of the city. The city closely followed a grid plan with streets running at right angles to form city blocks. In 1871, the Hokkaidō Shrine was built in its current location as the Sapporo Shrine.

Edwin Dun came to Sapporo to establish sheep and cattle ranches in 1876. He also demonstrated pig raising and the making of butter, cheese, ham, and sausage. He was married twice, to Japanese women. He returned to the US in 1883 but later returned to Japan as a government secretary. William S. Clark, who was the president of the Massachusetts Agricultural College (now the University of Massachusetts Amherst), came to be the founding vice-president of the Sapporo Agricultural College (now Hokkaido University) for eight months from 1876 to 1877. He taught academic science subjects and lectured on the Bible as an ethics course, introducing Christian principles to the college's first entering class.

In 1880, the entire area of Sapporo was renamed as "Sapporo-ku" (Sapporo Ward), and a railroad between Sapporo and Temiya, Otaru was laid. That year, the Hōheikan, a hotel and reception facility for visiting officials and dignitaries, was built adjacent to the Odori Park. It was later moved to Nakajima Park, where it remains today. Two years later, with the abolition of the Kaitaku-shi, Hokkaidō was divided into three prefectures: Hakodate, Sapporo, and Nemuro. The name of the urban district in Sapporo remained Sapporo-ku, while the rest of the area in Sapporo-ku was changed to Sapporo-gun. The administrative headquarters of Sapporo-ku was also located in the urban district.

Sapporo, Hakodate, and Nemuro Prefectures were abolished in 1886, and Hokkaidō government office building, an American-neo-baroque-style structure with red bricks, was constructed in 1888. The last squad of the Tondenhei, the soldiers who pioneered Hokkaido, settled in the area where the Tonden district in Kita-ku, Sapporo is currently located. Sapporo-ku administered the surrounding Sapporo-gun until 1899, when the new district system was announced. After that year, Sapporo-ku was away from the control of Sapporo-gun. The "ku" (district) enforced from 1899 was an autonomy which was a little bigger than towns, and smaller than cities. In Hokkaido at that time, Hakodate-ku and Otaru-ku also existed.

=== 20th century ===
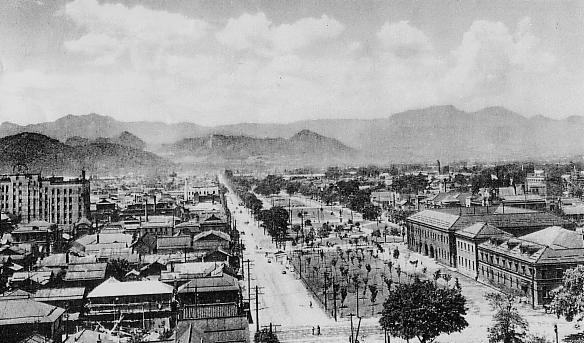
Odori Park in 1936

In 1907, Tohoku Imperial University was established in Sendai, Miyagi Prefecture, and Sapporo Agricultural College became part of the university as its faculty of agriculture. Parts of neighbouring villages, including Sapporo Village, Naebo Village, Kami Shiroishi Village, and districts where the Tonden-hei had settled, were integrated into Sapporo-ku in 1910. The Sapporo Streetcar was opened in 1918, and Hokkaido Imperial University was established in Sapporo-ku as the fifth Imperial University in Japan, by splitting off the agricultural faculty from Tohoku Imperial University again—another railroad operated in Sapporo, the Jōzankei Line, which was ultimately abolished in 1969.

In 1922, the national government in Tokyo announced a new city system, and Sapporo-ku was officially renamed Sapporo City. The Sapporo Municipal Bus System was started in 1930. In 1937, Sapporo was chosen as the site of the 1940 Winter Olympics, but the outbreak of the Second Sino-Japanese War led to its cancellation the next year. Maruyama Town was integrated as a part of Chūō-ku in 1940, and the Okadama Airport was constructed in 1942. During World War II, the city was bombed by American naval aircraft in July 1945.

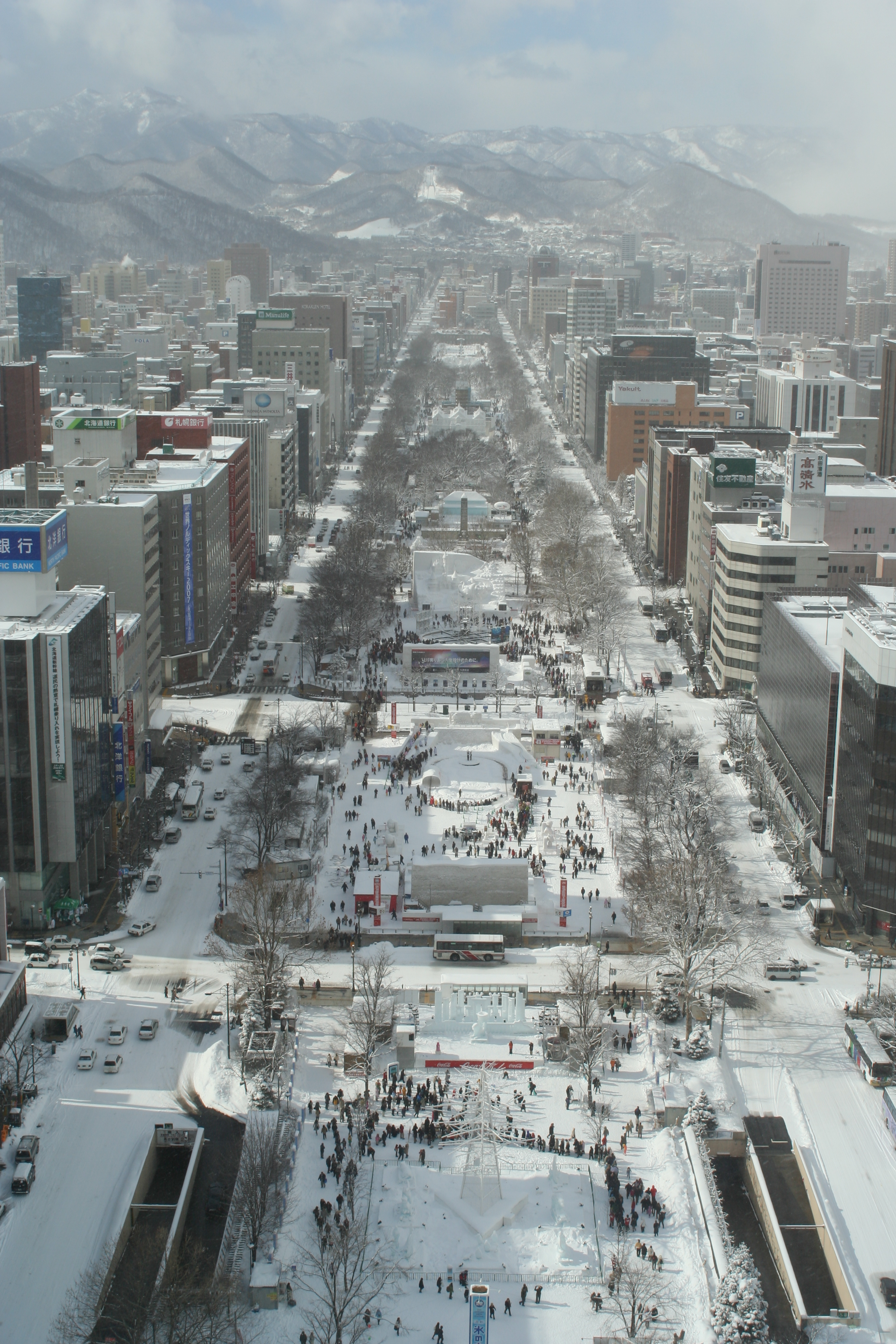
Sapporo Snow Festival in 2007; first held in 1950

View of the city from Sapporo TV Tower, 2016

The first Sapporo Snow Festival was held in 1950. In the same year, adjacent Shiroishi Village was integrated into Sapporo City, rendered as a part of Shiroishi-ku, and Atsubetsu-ku. In 1955, Kotoni Town, the entire Sapporo Village, and Shinoro Village were merged into Sapporo, becoming a part of the current Chūō-ku, Kita-ku, Higashi-ku, Nishi-ku, and Teine-ku. The expansion of Sapporo continued, with the merger of Toyohira Town in 1961, and Teine Town in 1967, each becoming a part of Toyohira-ku, Kiyota-ku, and Teine-ku.

The ceremony commemorating the 100th anniversary of the foundation of Sapporo and Hokkaido was held in 1968. The Sapporo Municipal Subway system was inaugurated in 1971, which made Sapporo the fourth city in Japan to have a subway system. From February 3 to 13, 1972, the 1972 Winter Olympics were held, the first Winter Olympics held in Asia. On April 1 of the same year, Sapporo was designated as one of the cities designated by government ordinance, and seven wards were established. The last public performance by the opera singer, Maria Callas, was in Sapporo at the Hokkaido Koseinenkin Kaikan on 11 November 1974. The Sapporo Municipal Subway was expanded when the Tōzai line started operation in 1976, and the Tōhō line was opened in 1988, as well as the New Chitose Airport in the same year. In 1989, Atsubetsu-ku and Teine-ku were separated from Shiroishi-ku and Nishi-ku. Annual events in Sapporo began, including the Pacific Music Festival in 1990 and the Yosakoi Sōran Festival in 1992. A professional football club, Consadole Sapporo, was established in 1996. In 1997, Kiyota-ku was separated from Toyohira-ku. In the same year, Hokkaidō Takushoku Bank, a Hokkaido-based bank with headquarters in Odori, went bankrupt.

=== 21st century ===
In 2001, construction of the Sapporo Dome was completed. In 2002, the Dome hosted three matches during the 2002 FIFA World Cup: Germany vs Saudi Arabia, Argentina vs England, and Italy vs Ecuador, all in the first round. Fumio Ueda was elected as Sapporo mayor for the first time in 2003. Sapporo became the home to a Nippon Professional Baseball team, Hokkaido Nippon-Ham Fighters, in 2004, which won the 2006 Japan Series, and the victory parade was held on Ekimae-Dōri (a street in front of Sapporo Station) in February 2007.

The Hokkaidō Shinkansen line, which currently connects Honshu to Hakodate through the Seikan Tunnel, is planned to link to Sapporo by March 2039.

== Geography ==
Location of Ishikari Subprefecture in Hokkaido

Sapporo is located in the southwest part of Ishikari Plain and the alluvial fan of the Toyohira River, a tributary of the Ishikari River. It is part of Ishikari Subprefecture. Roadways in the urban district are laid out in a grid pattern. The western and southern parts of Sapporo are occupied by several mountains, including Mount Teine, Maruyama, and Mount Moiwa, as well as many rivers, including the Ishikari River, Toyohira River, and Sōsei River. Sapporo has an elevation of 29 m (95 ft 2 in).

Sapporo has many parks, including Ōdōri Park in the heart of the city, which hosts several annual events and festivals. Moerenuma Park is also one of the largest parks in Sapporo, and was constructed under the plan of Isamu Noguchi, a Japanese-American artist and landscape architect.

Neighbouring cities are Ishikari, Ebetsu, Kitahiroshima, Eniwa, Chitose, Otaru, Date, and adjoining towns are Tōbetsu, Kimobetsu, Kyōgoku.

== Climate ==
Sapporo

Climate chart (precipitation, max. and min. temperature)
J	F	M	A	M	J	J	A	S	O	N	D
108 0 −6	92 0 −6	78 5 −2	55 12 3	56 18 9	60 22 13	91 25 18	127 26 19	142 23 15	110 16 8	114 9 2	115 2 −4
- █ Average max. and min. temperatures in °C
- █ Precipitation totals in mm
Imperial conversion
J	F	M	A	M	J	J	A	S	O	N	D
4.3 31 20	3.6 33 21	3.1 40 28	2.1 53 38	2.2 64 48	2.4 71 56	3.6 78 64	5 80 66	5.6 73 59	4.3 62 46	4.5 48 35	4.5 36 25
- █ Average max. and min. temperatures in °F
- █ Precipitation totals in inches

Sapporo has a humid continental climate (Köppen: Dfa), with a wide range of temperature between the summer and winter. Summers are generally warm and humid, but not oppressively hot, and winters are cold and very snowy, with an average snowfall of 4.79 m (15 ft 9 in) per year. Sapporo is one of few metropolises in the world with such heavy snowfall, enabling it to hold events and festivals with snow statues. The heavy snowfall is due to the Siberian High developing over the Eurasian land mass and the Aleutian Low developing over the northern Pacific Ocean, resulting in a flow of cold air southeastward across the Tsushima Current and to western Hokkaido. The city's annual average precipitation is around 1,100 mm (43.3 in), and the mean annual temperature is 8.5 °C (47.3 °F).

The highest temperature ever recorded in Sapporo was 36.3 °C (97.3 °F) on August 23, 2023. The coldest temperature ever recorded was −28.5 °C (−19.3 °F) on February 1, 1929.

Climate data for Sapporo (elevation 17.4 m, 1991–2020 normals, extremes 1876–present)
Month	Jan	Feb	Mar	Apr	May	Jun	Jul	Aug	Sep	Oct	Nov	Dec	Year
Record high °C (°F)	11.2 (52.2)	13.9 (57.0)	19.1 (66.4)	28.0 (82.4)	34.2 (93.6)	33.7 (92.7)	36.0 (96.8)	36.3 (97.3)	32.7 (90.9)	29.7 (85.5)	22.4 (72.3)	14.8 (58.6)	36.3 (97.3)
Mean maximum °C (°F)	5.1 (41.2)	7.1 (44.8)	12.4 (54.3)	21.3 (70.3)	27.4 (81.3)	29.0 (84.2)	31.4 (88.5)	32.0 (89.6)	28.8 (83.8)	22.7 (72.9)	17.2 (63.0)	9.4 (48.9)	32.8 (91.0)
Mean daily maximum °C (°F)	−0.4 (31.3)	0.4 (32.7)	4.5 (40.1)	11.7 (53.1)	17.9 (64.2)	21.8 (71.2)	25.4 (77.7)	26.4 (79.5)	22.8 (73.0)	16.4 (61.5)	8.7 (47.7)	2.0 (35.6)	13.1 (55.6)
Daily mean °C (°F)	−3.2 (26.2)	−2.7 (27.1)	1.1 (34.0)	7.3 (45.1)	13.0 (55.4)	17.0 (62.6)	21.1 (70.0)	22.3 (72.1)	18.6 (65.5)	12.1 (53.8)	5.2 (41.4)	−0.9 (30.4)	9.2 (48.6)
Mean daily minimum °C (°F)	−6.4 (20.5)	−6.2 (20.8)	−2.4 (27.7)	3.4 (38.1)	9.0 (48.2)	13.4 (56.1)	17.9 (64.2)	19.1 (66.4)	14.8 (58.6)	8.0 (46.4)	1.6 (34.9)	−4.0 (24.8)	5.7 (42.3)
Mean minimum °C (°F)	−11.8 (10.8)	−11.7 (10.9)	−8.0 (17.6)	−1.5 (29.3)	3.9 (39.0)	8.9 (48.0)	13.6 (56.5)	14.8 (58.6)	9.3 (48.7)	2.4 (36.3)	−4.3 (24.3)	−9.0 (15.8)	−12.8 (9.0)
Record low °C (°F)	−27.0 (−16.6)	−28.5 (−19.3)	−22.6 (−8.7)	−14.6 (5.7)	−4.2 (24.4)	0.0 (32.0)	5.2 (41.4)	5.3 (41.5)	−0.9 (30.4)	−4.4 (24.1)	−15.5 (4.1)	−24.7 (−12.5)	−28.5 (−19.3)
Average precipitation mm (inches)	108.4 (4.27)	91.9 (3.62)	77.6 (3.06)	54.6 (2.15)	55.5 (2.19)	60.4 (2.38)	90.7 (3.57)	126.8 (4.99)	142.2 (5.60)	109.9 (4.33)	113.8 (4.48)	114.5 (4.51)	1,146.1 (45.12)
Average snowfall cm (inches)	137 (54)	116 (46)	74 (29)	6 (2.4)	0 (0)	0 (0)	0 (0)	0 (0)	0 (0)	1 (0.4)	30 (12)	113 (44)	479 (189)
Average precipitation days (≥ 0.5 mm)	22.1	19.2	18.3	12.3	10.2	9.3	9.4	10.5	11.7	14.0	18.3	19.9	175.1
Average snowy days	29.1	25.2	22.5	6.7	0.1	0.0	0.0	0.0	0.0	0.9	13.5	26.8	124.4
Average relative humidity (%)	69	68	65	61	65	72	75	75	71	67	67	68	69
Mean monthly sunshine hours	90.4	103.5	144.7	175.8	200.4	180.0	168.0	168.1	159.3	145.9	99.1	82.7	1,718
Source: Japan Meteorological Agency (1991–2020 normals, extremes 1876–present)

Climate data for Yamaguchi, Sapporo (elevation 5 m, 1991–2020 normals, extremes 1977–present)
Month	Jan	Feb	Mar	Apr	May	Jun	Jul	Aug	Sep	Oct	Nov	Dec	Year
Record high °C (°F)	9.3 (48.7)	11.8 (53.2)	17.9 (64.2)	29.5 (85.1)	33.5 (92.3)	34.1 (93.4)	37.1 (98.8)	36.0 (96.8)	33.8 (92.8)	28.7 (83.7)	23.6 (74.5)	15.0 (59.0)	37.1 (98.8)
Mean daily maximum °C (°F)	−0.4 (31.3)	0.2 (32.4)	4.0 (39.2)	11.3 (52.3)	17.7 (63.9)	21.5 (70.7)	25.1 (77.2)	26.3 (79.3)	22.9 (73.2)	16.5 (61.7)	8.8 (47.8)	1.9 (35.4)	13.0 (55.4)
Daily mean °C (°F)	−3.7 (25.3)	−3.3 (26.1)	0.4 (32.7)	6.5 (43.7)	12.2 (54.0)	16.2 (61.2)	20.3 (68.5)	21.6 (70.9)	17.8 (64.0)	11.4 (52.5)	4.7 (40.5)	−1.3 (29.7)	8.6 (47.5)
Mean daily minimum °C (°F)	−7.7 (18.1)	−7.7 (18.1)	−3.8 (25.2)	1.6 (34.9)	7.1 (44.8)	11.9 (53.4)	16.4 (61.5)	17.5 (63.5)	12.8 (55.0)	6.1 (43.0)	0.5 (32.9)	−5.0 (23.0)	4.1 (39.4)
Record low °C (°F)	−20.9 (−5.6)	−20.3 (−4.5)	−17.6 (0.3)	−9.7 (14.5)	−1.5 (29.3)	0.9 (33.6)	7.2 (45.0)	8.2 (46.8)	1.8 (35.2)	−3.0 (26.6)	−9.9 (14.2)	−16.7 (1.9)	−20.9 (−5.6)
Average precipitation mm (inches)	84.9 (3.34)	66.5 (2.62)	53.4 (2.10)	46.7 (1.84)	51.9 (2.04)	52.1 (2.05)	86.3 (3.40)	122.0 (4.80)	131.8 (5.19)	101.8 (4.01)	107.4 (4.23)	93.3 (3.67)	998.0 (39.29)
Mean monthly sunshine hours	78.9	88.6	144.2	181.3	195.3	165.5	161.6	171.1	162.8	142.9	94.3	76.7	1,668.1
Source: Japan Meteorological Agency (1991–2020 normals, extremes 1977–present)

== Administration ==
=== Wards ===
Sapporo currently has ten wards (区, ku).

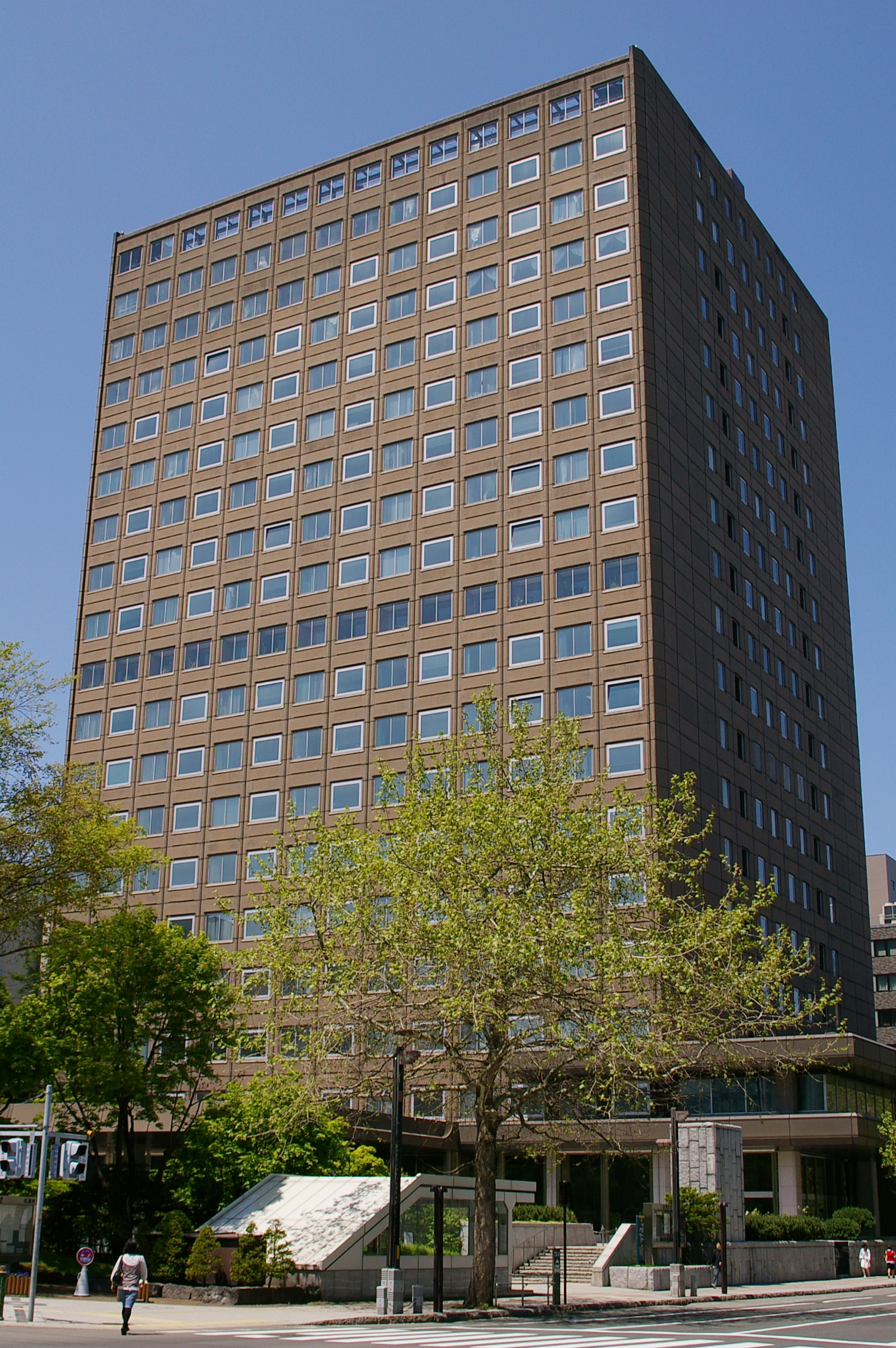
Sapporo City Hall (June 2007)

	Name	Kanji	Population (as of 1 August 2026)	Land area in km^{2}	Pop. density per km^{2}	Map of Sapporo
1	Atsubetsu-ku	厚別区	121,167	24.38	5,221	A map of Sapporo's Wards
2	Chūō-ku	中央区	256,156	46.42	5,122	A map of Sapporo's Wards
3	Higashi-ku	東区	261,237	56.97	4,597	A map of Sapporo's Wards
4	Kita-ku	北区	285,148	63.57	4,499	A map of Sapporo's Wards
5	Kiyota-ku	清田区	107,137	59.87	1,897	A map of Sapporo's Wards
6	Minami-ku	南区	131,862	657.48	208	A map of Sapporo's Wards
7	Nishi-ku	西区	217,984	75.10	2,887	A map of Sapporo's Wards
8	Shiroishi-ku	白石区	211,224	34.47	6,188	A map of Sapporo's Wards
9	Teine-ku	手稲区	138,378	56.77	2,499	A map of Sapporo's Wards
10	Toyohira-ku	豊平区	232,303	46.23	4,833	A map of Sapporo's Wards

=== Demographics ===
The first census of Sapporo's population was conducted in 1873, when 753 families totaling 1,785 people were recorded in the town. The city has an estimated population of 1,962,596 as of August 1, 2026 and a population density of 1,750 inhabitants per square kilometre (4,500/sq mi). The total area is 1,121.26 km^{2} (432 15/16 sq mi).

Historical population

Year	Pop.	±%
1873	1,785	—
1920	105,182	+5792.5%
1925	149,314	+42.0%
1930	174,179	+16.7%
1935	196,541	+12.8%
1940	206,103	+4.9%
1950	313,850	+52.3%
1955	426,620	+35.9%
1960	523,839	+22.8%
1965	794,908	+51.7%
1970	1,010,123	+27.1%

Year	Pop.	±%
1975	1,240,613	+22.8%
1980	1,401,757	+13.0%
1985	1,542,979	+10.1%
1990	1,671,742	+8.3%
1995	1,757,025	+5.1%
2000	1,822,368	+3.7%
2005	1,880,863	+3.2%
2010	1,913,545	+1.7%
2015	1,952,356	+2.0%
2020	1,970,277	+0.9%
2025	1,964,034	−0.3%

Source: Statistics Bureau

=== Surrounding municipalities ===
Ishikari Subprefecture

- Ebetsu
- Kitahiroshima
- Ishikari
- Eniwa
- Chitose
- Ishikari District：Tōbetsu

Shiribeshi Subprefecture

- Otaru
- Abuta District：Kimobetsu
- Abuta District：Kyōgoku
- Yoichi District：Akaigawa

Iburi Subprefecture

- Date

== Economy ==
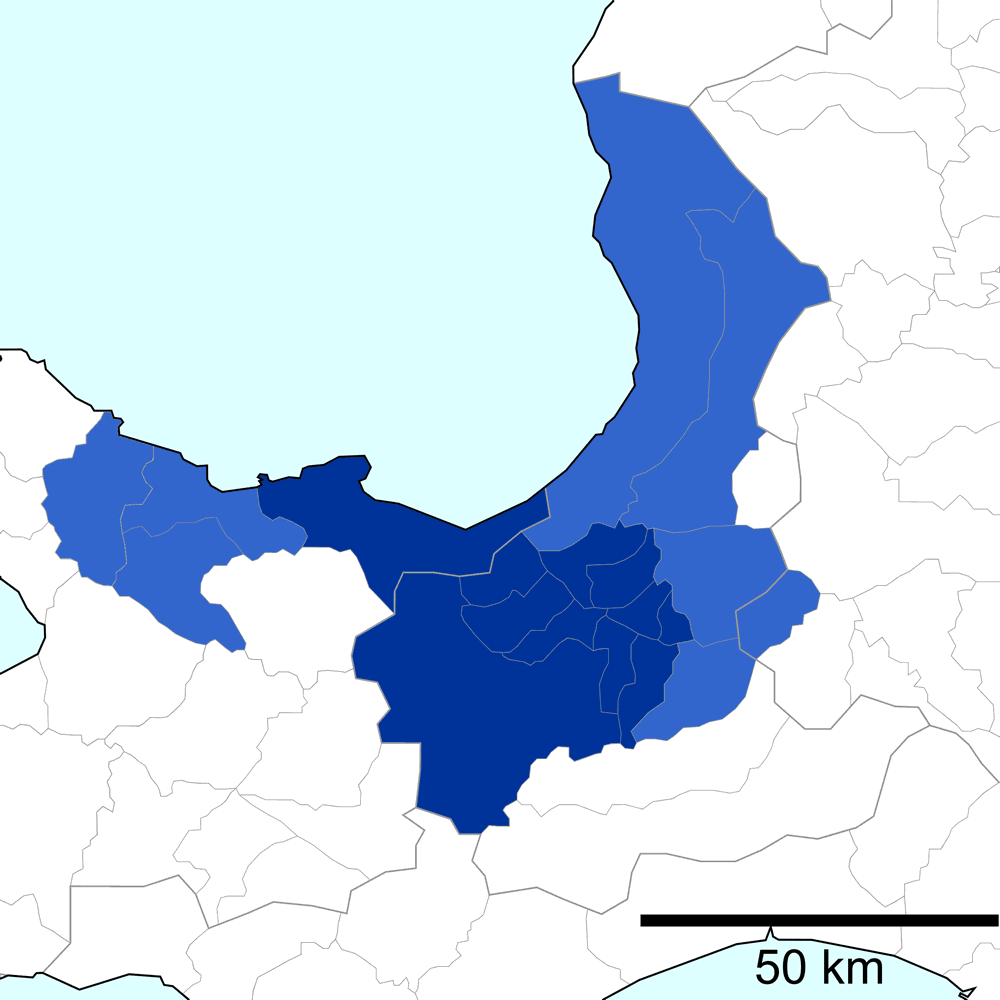
Sapporo MEA

The tertiary sector dominates Sapporo's industry. Major industries include information technology, retail, and tourism, as Sapporo is a destination for winter sports and events and summer activities due to its comparatively cool climate.

The city is also the manufacturing centre of Hokkaido, manufacturing various goods such as food and related products, fabricated metal products, steel, machinery, beverages, and pulp and paper. The Sapporo Breweries, founded in 1876, is a major company and employer in the city.

Hokkaido International Airlines (Air Do) is headquartered in Chūō-ku. In April 2004, Air Nippon Network was headquartered in Higashi-ku. Other companies headquartered in Sapporo include Crypton Future Media, DB-Soft,Hokkaido Air System, and Royce'.

== Transport ==
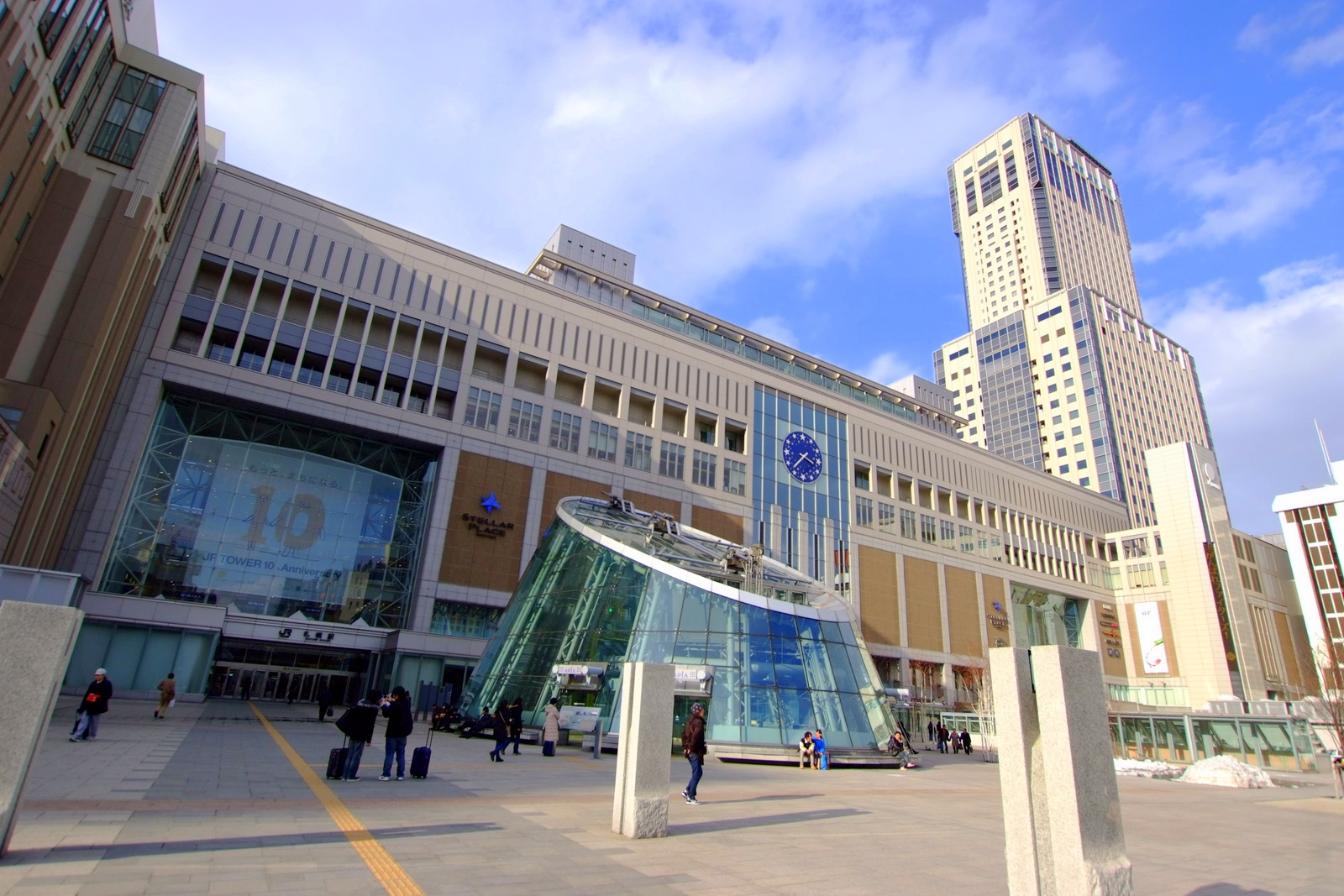
Sapporo Station

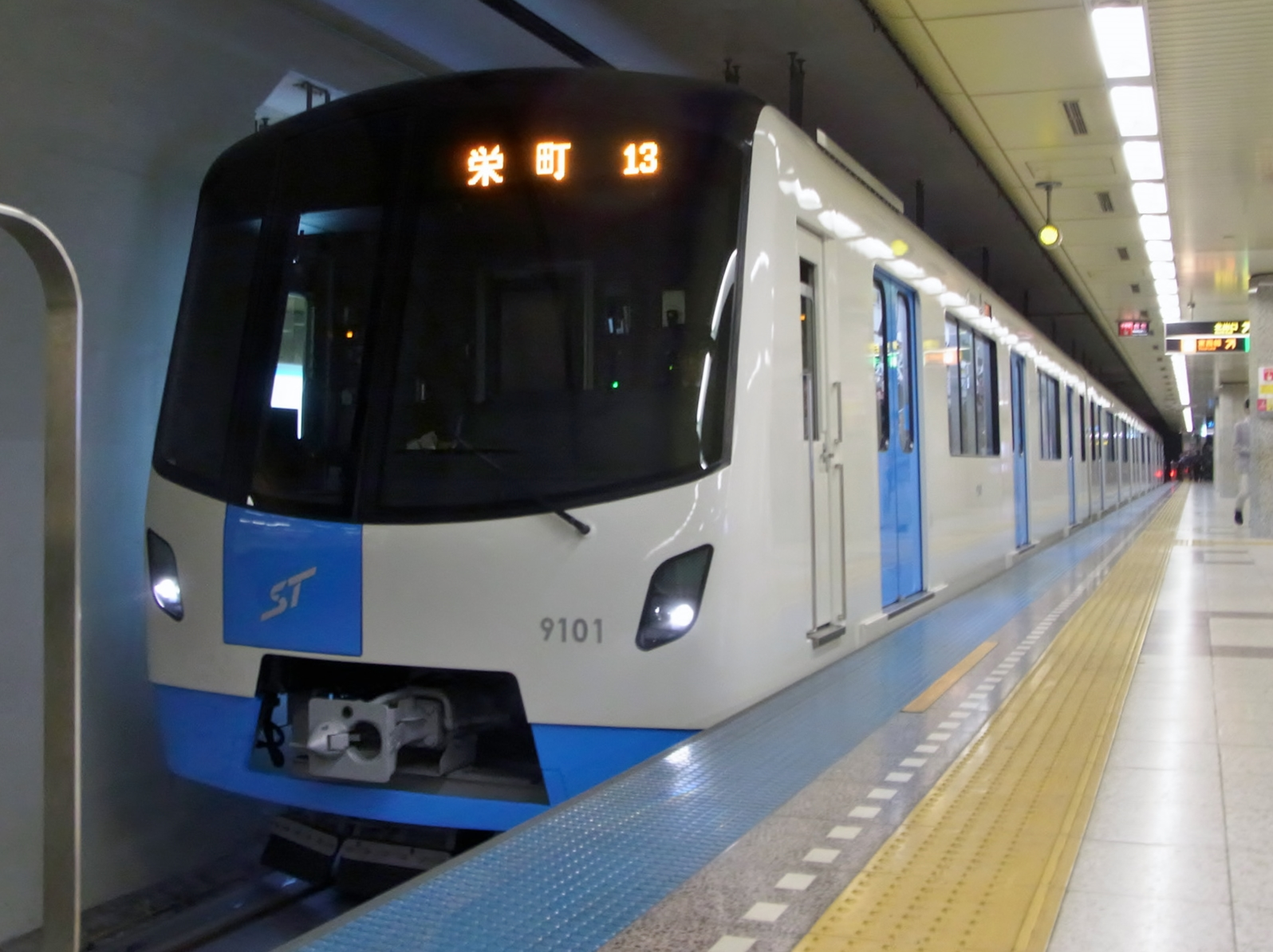
Sapporo Municipal Subway is the only rubber-tired metro system in East Asia.

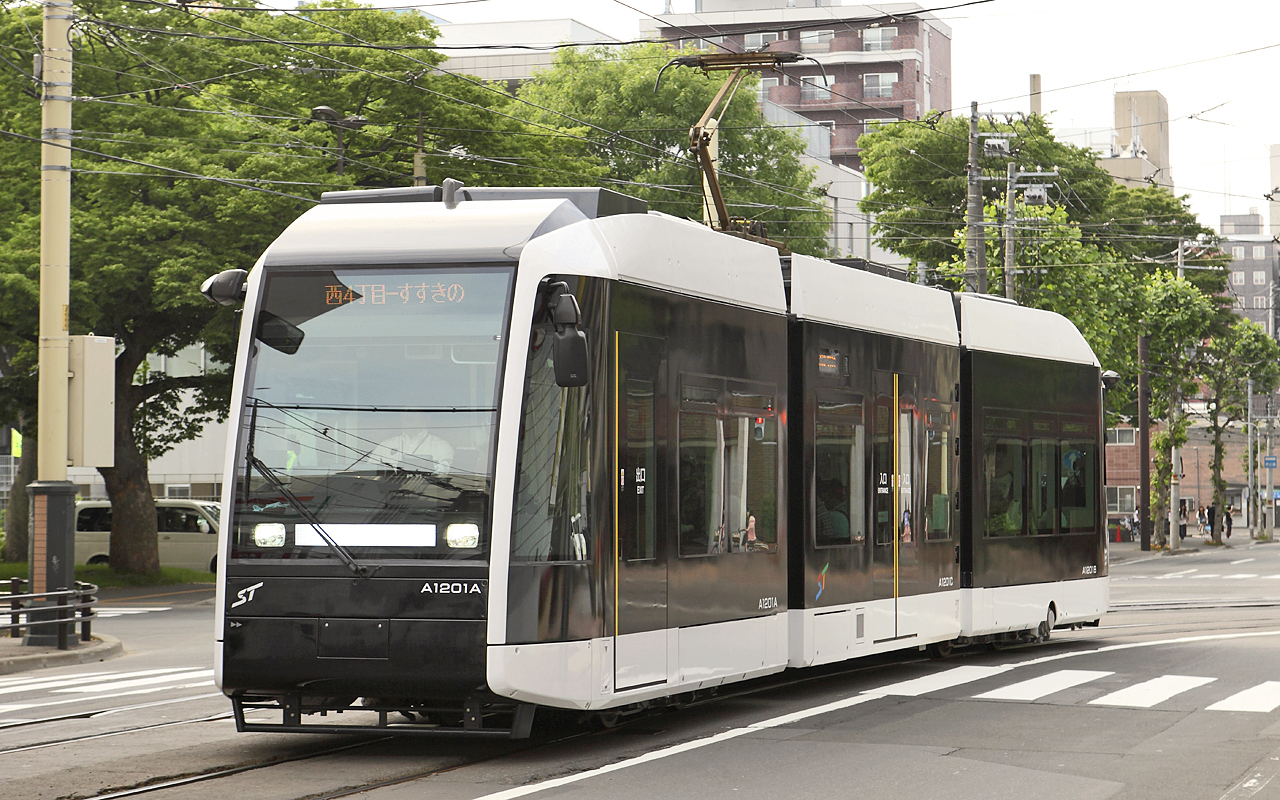
The Sapporo Streetcar is one of only two operational circular tram systems in Asia (the other being a similar tram system in Kaohsiung, Taiwan).

Sapporo has one streetcar line, three JR Hokkaido lines, three subway lines, and JR Bus, Chuo Bus, and other bus lines. Sapporo Subway trains have rubber-tired wheels.

=== Airways ===
==== Airport ====
Two airports serve the Sapporo area: Okadama Airport, which offers regional flights within Hokkaido and some parts of Japan, while New Chitose Airport, a larger international airport located in the city of Chitose 50 kilometres (30 mi) away, connected by regular rapid trains taking around 40 minutes. New Chitose is the primary gateway to the city and also the prefecture. The Sapporo-Tokyo route between New Chitose and Haneda is the second busiest in the world, after the Gimpo-to-Jeju route in South Korea.

=== Railways ===
JR Hokkaido Stations in Sapporo

==== High-speed rail ====
JR Hokkaido

- Hokkaido Shinkansen（2039）

==== Conventional lines ====
JR Hokkaido

- Hakodate Line: (Zenibako) – Hoshimi – Hoshioki – Inaho – Teine – Inazumi Kōen – Hassamu – Hassamu Chūō – Kotoni – Sōen – Sapporo – Naebo – Shiroishi – Atsubetsu – Shinrinkōen – (Ōasa)
- Chitose Line: Heiwa – Shin Sapporo – Kami Nopporo – (Kita-Hiroshima)
- Sasshō Line (Gakuentoshi Line): Sōen – Hachiken – Shinkawa – Shinkotoni – Taihei – Yurigahara – Shinoro – Takuhoku – Ainosato Kyōikudai – Ainosato Kōen – (Ishikari Futomi)

==== Subways ====
- Sapporo Municipal Subway provides urban transit service.

==== Tramways ====
- Sapporo Streetcar

==== Rapid transit ====
- Mount Moiwa Ropeway
- Teineyama Ropeway

=== Busways ===
An airport shuttle bus servicing hotels in Sapporo operates every day of the year. SkyExpress was founded in 2005 and also provides transport to and from various ski resorts throughout Hokkaido, including Niseko.

== Sightseeing ==
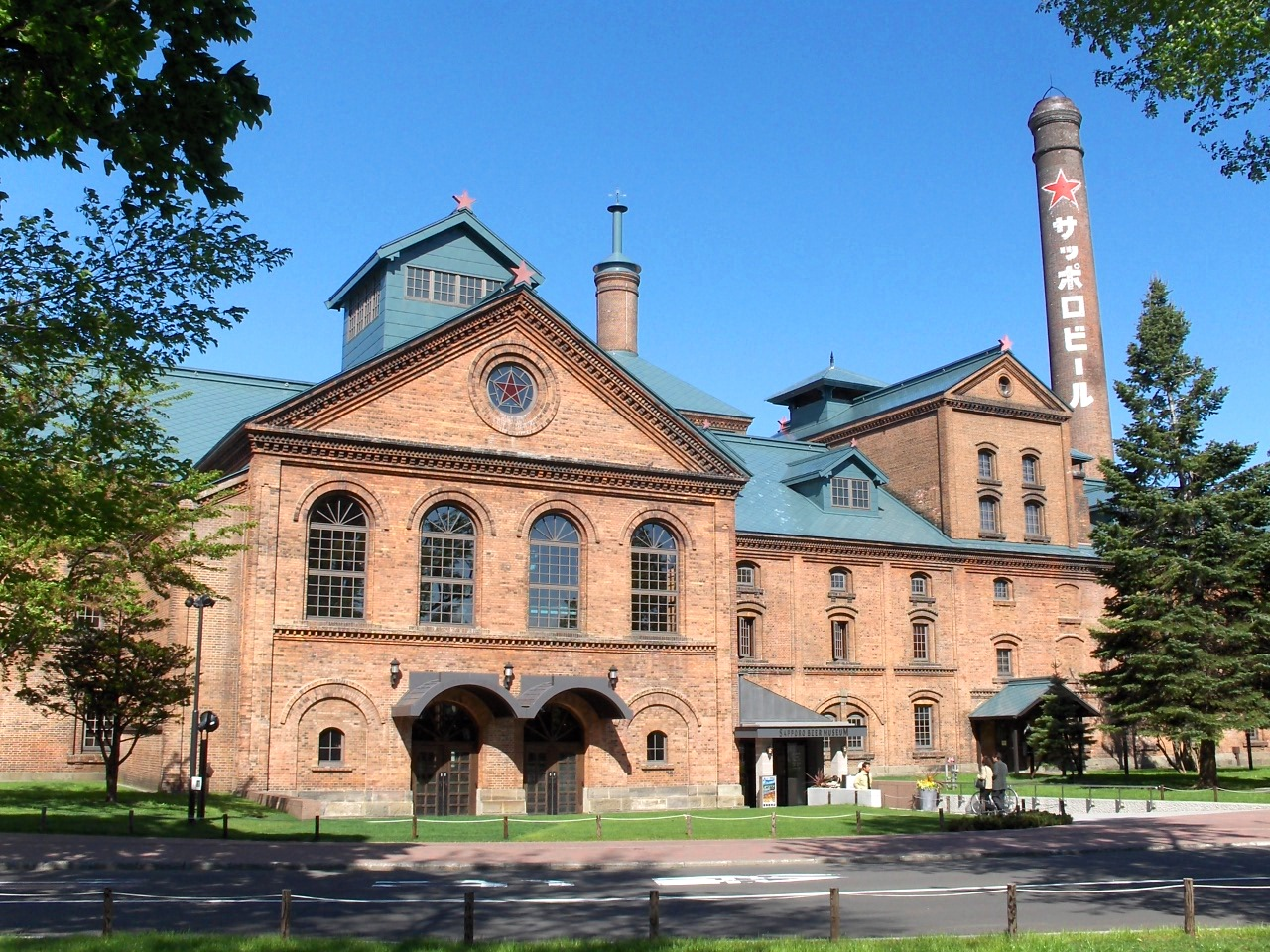
Sapporo Beer Museum

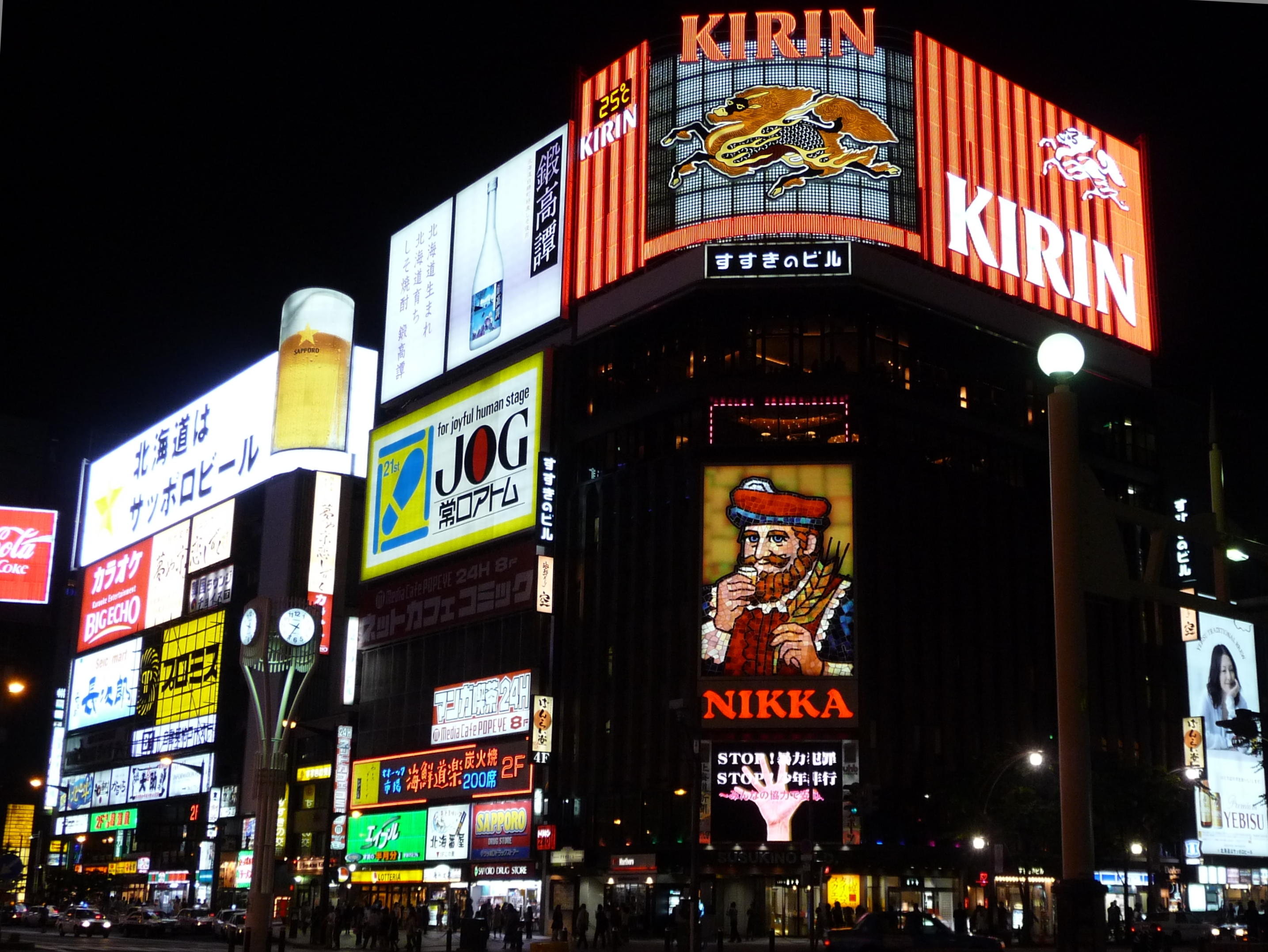
Susukino, the entertainment district of Sapporo

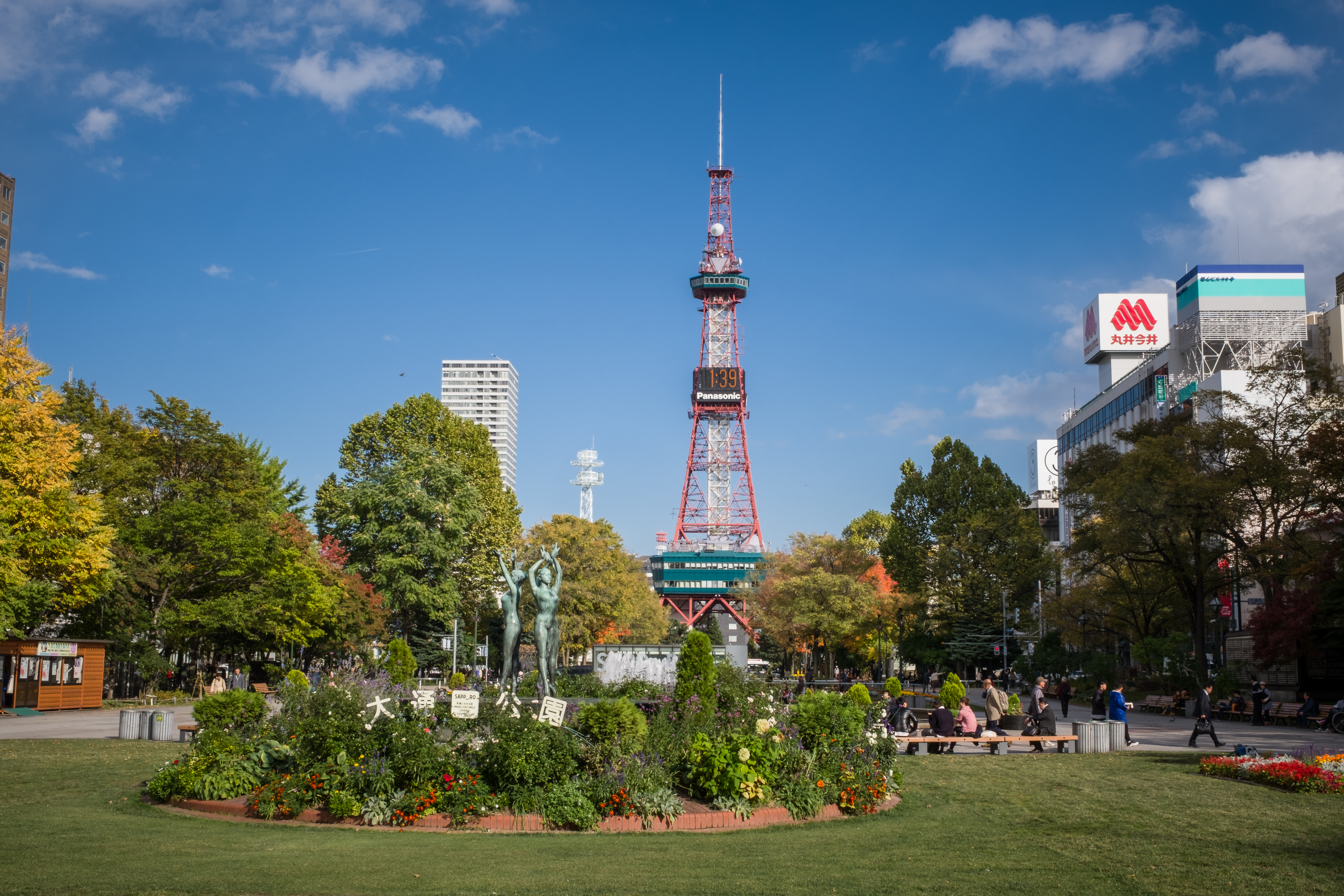
Odori Park (2018)

Toyohira River running through Jōzankei district, known for its onsen

=== Points of interest ===
- The former Hokkaidō government office building
- The Sapporo Clock Tower
- The Hokkaidō Shrine
- Nishino Shrine
- Hokkaido Museum
- Historical Village of Hokkaido
- Sapporo Buried Cultural Property Center
- The Sapporo City Archive Museum (Former Sapporo Court of Appeal)
- The Edwin Dun Memorial Hall
- The Hokkaido University & Hokkaido University Museum
- The Sapporo Beer Museum & Sapporo Factory
- The Sapporo TV Tower
- The Sapporo Convention Center
- The Sapporo Salmon Museum in Makomanai Park
- The Sunpiazza Aquarium

Sapporo JR Tower adjacent to Sapporo Station.

Sapporo Ramen Yokocho and Norubesa (a building with a Ferris wheel) are in the Susukino district. The district also includes the Tanuki Kōji Shopping Arcade, the city's oldest shopping mall.

The district of Jōzankei in Minami-ku has many resort hotels with steam baths and onsen.

The Peace Pagoda, one of many such monuments across the world built by the Buddhist order Nipponzan Myohoji to promote and inspire world peace, has a stupa that was built in 1959, halfway up Mount Moiwa, to commemorate peace after World War II. It contains some of the Buddha's ashes, which Prime Minister Nehru presented to the Emperor of Japan in 1954. Another portion was presented to Mikhail Gorbachev by the Nipponzan-Myohoji monk, Junsei Terasawa.

=== Parks/gardens ===
- Asahiyama Memorial Park offers great views of the city
- Hitsujigaoka Observation Hill has a farm with sheep and attracts visitors with a statue of William S. Clark
- Hokkaido University Botanical Gardens and The Chizaki Rose Garden
- Maruyama Park is located next to the Hokkaido Shrine and houses the Maruyama Zoo
- Moerenuma Park
- Nakajima Park
- Nishioka Park is a location of rich nature that centers around a pond and consists of marshland and the forest of the Tsukisamu River and its upper river basin. This park also serves as one of the main habitats in Hokkaido for many types of wild birds.
- Odori Park

== Culture ==
=== Art ===
- The Hokkaido Museum of Modern Art represents Hokkaido artists like Eien Iwahashi, Kinjiro Kida, Nissho Kanda, Tamako Kataoka, and especially glass objects of École de Paris
- The Hongō Shin Memorial Museum of Sculpture hosts a collection of over 1,800 works by the artist Hongō Shin.
- The Sapporo Art Park contains Art museum featuring outdoor installations & a sculpture garden, and the old house of Takeo Arishima.
- The Moerenuma Park including the Glass Pyramid, designed by Isamu Noguchi
- The Migishi Kotaro Museum of Art
- The Miyanomori Art Museum
- The Sapporo Odori 500-m Underground Walkway Gallery
- Member of UNESCO Creative Cities Network as a Creative City of Media Arts since 2013
- Sapporo International Art Festival (2014/2017/2024)

=== Cuisine ===
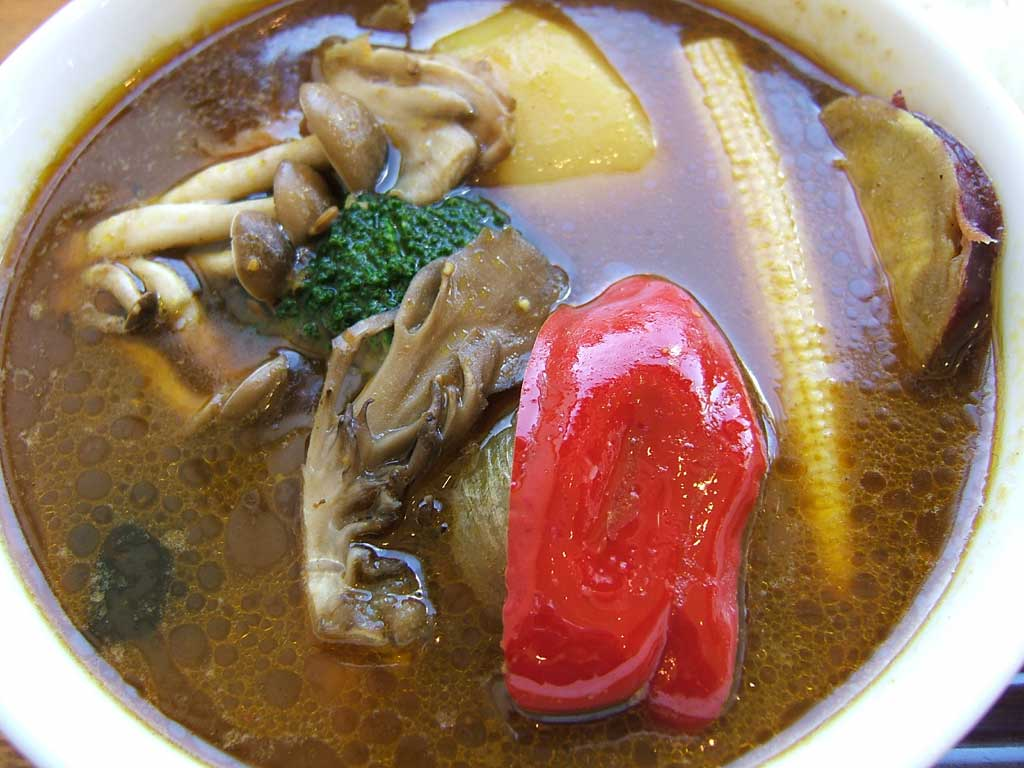
Soup curry

The city is home to Sapporo Brewery, white chocolate biscuits known as 'shiroi koibito' (白い恋人), and also as the birthplace of miso ramen. Kouraku Ramen Meitengai, in the Susukino district, is an alley lined with many miso ramen restaurants since 1951. After its demolition, due to plans for the Sapporo Olympics, the Ganso Sapporo Ramen Yokocho was established in its place. It attracts many tourists throughout the year. From 1966, a food company named Sanyo Foods began to sell instant ramen under the brand name "Sapporo Ichiban".

Haskap, a local variety of edible honeysuckle, similar to blueberries, is a specialty in Sapporo. Other specialty dishes of Sapporo include: soup curry, a soupy curry made with vegetables and chicken, sometimes other meats too, and jingisukan, a barbecue of lamb dish, named after Genghis Khan. Sapporo Sweets is a confectionery using many ingredients from Hokkaido, where the Sapporo Sweets Competition is held annually. Sapporo is also well known for fresh seafood including salmon, sea urchin and crab. Crab, in particular, is famed. Many types of crab are harvested and served seasonally in Sapporo, such as the horsehair crab, snow crab, king crab, and Hanasaki crab, with numerous dishes centered on them.

=== Events/festivals ===
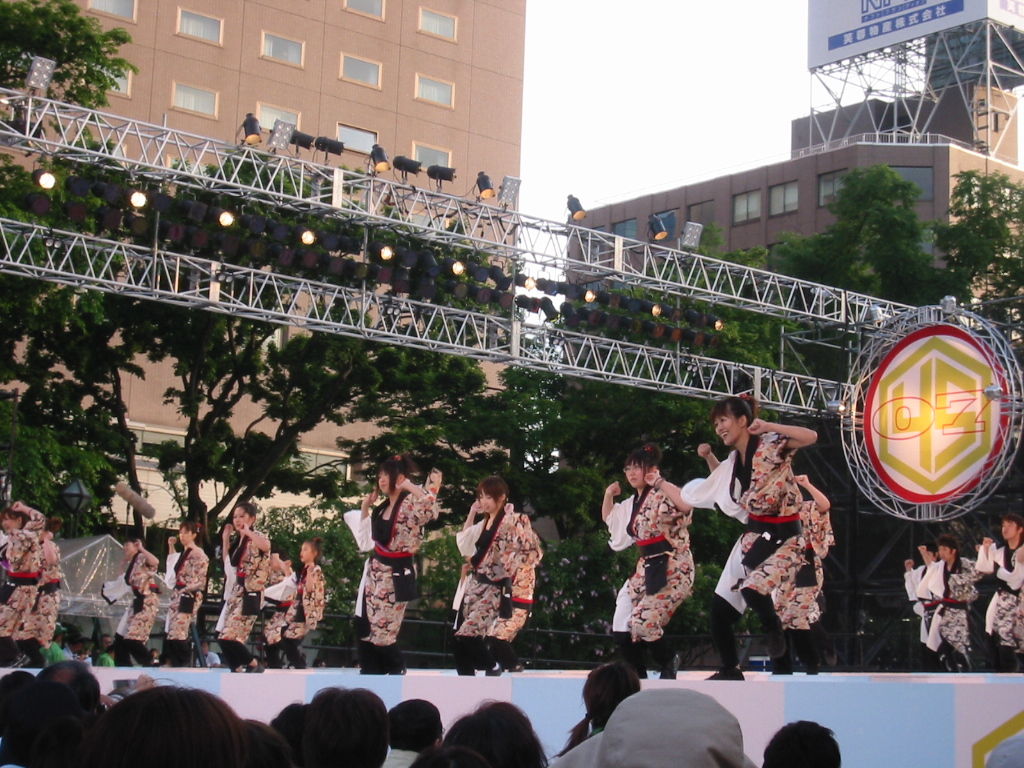
Dancers in the Yosakoi Sōran Festival

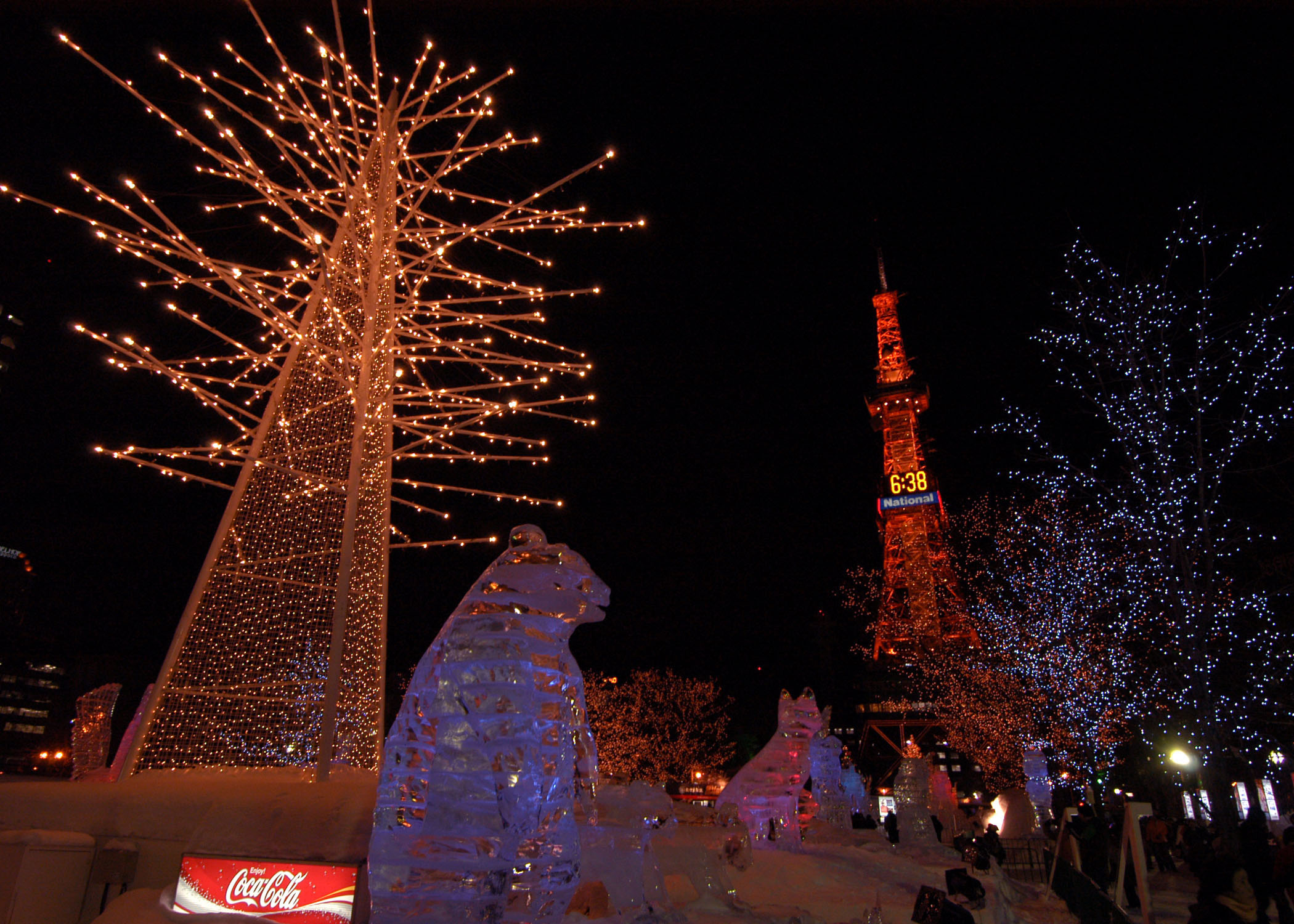
Sapporo Snow Festival

February: the Sapporo Snow Festival. The main site is at Odori Park, and other sites include Susukino (known as the Susukino Ice Festival) and Sapporo Satoland. Many of the snow and ice statues are built by members of the Japan Ground Self-Defense Force.

May: the Sapporo Lilac Festival. Lilac was brought to Sapporo in 1889 by an American educator, Sarah Clara Smith. At the festival, people enjoy the flowers, wine, and live music.

June: the Yosakoi Soran Festival. The festival sites are centered on Odori Park and the street leading to Susukino, with additional sites. At the festival, many dance teams perform to music based on the Japanese traditional song "Sōran Bushi". Members of the dancing teams wear special costumes and compete on the roads or on stages set up at the festival sites. In 2006, 350 teams were featured with around 45,000 dancers, and over 1,860,000 people visited the festival.

The Sapporo Summer Festival. People enjoy drinking at the beer garden in Odori Park and on the streets of Susukino. This festival consists of several fairs such as Tanuki Festival and Susukino Festival.

September: the Sapporo Autumn Festival

December: Christmas market in Odori Park, similar to German Christmas markets.

From November through January, many citizens enjoy the Sapporo White Illuminations.

=== Film ===
- The Idiot by Akira Kurosawa
- The Northern Museum of Visual Culture
- Theater Kino
- The Sapporo International Short Film Festival and Market

=== LGBT culture ===
Sapporo pride flag

The Rainbow March was a parade for lesbian, gay, bisexual, transgender and transsexual people (LGBT) people in Japan, held in Sapporo. Established in 1996, the event was the country's longest-running continuously run parade for LGBT people. It was last held in 2013.

=== Literature ===
- The Hokkaido Museum of Literature
- Takeo Arishima Residence in Sapporo Art Park
- Junichi Watanabe Museum of Literature

=== Music ===
- 1934 – The International Contemporary Music Festival was held by Akira Ifukube, Fumio Hayasaka, Atsushi Miura, and Isamu Ifukube (30 September)
- 1936 – Russian composer Alexander Tcherepnin visited Sapporo
- 1960 – The Sapporo Symphony Orchestra founded
- 1962 – John Cage and David Tudor visited Sapporo
- 1966 – Berliner Philharmoniker with Herbert von Karajan performed Brahms's Symphony No. 2 at Sapporo Shimin Kaikan (April)
- 1974 – Maria Callas last public performance at the Hokkaido Koseinenkin Kaikan (11 November)
- 1986 – The Sapporo Art Park includes the Outdoor Stage and Art Hall (27 July)
- 1990 – The Pacific Music Festival (PMF) started
- 1997 – The Sapporo Concert Hall Kitara opened
- 2007 - "01_ballade" by Eiji Hirasawa (from CFM) is released as a demo, later renamed to "Hoshi no Kakera" as the full song for Hatsune Miku's debut
- 2018 – The Sapporo Community Plaza opened

=== Sports ===
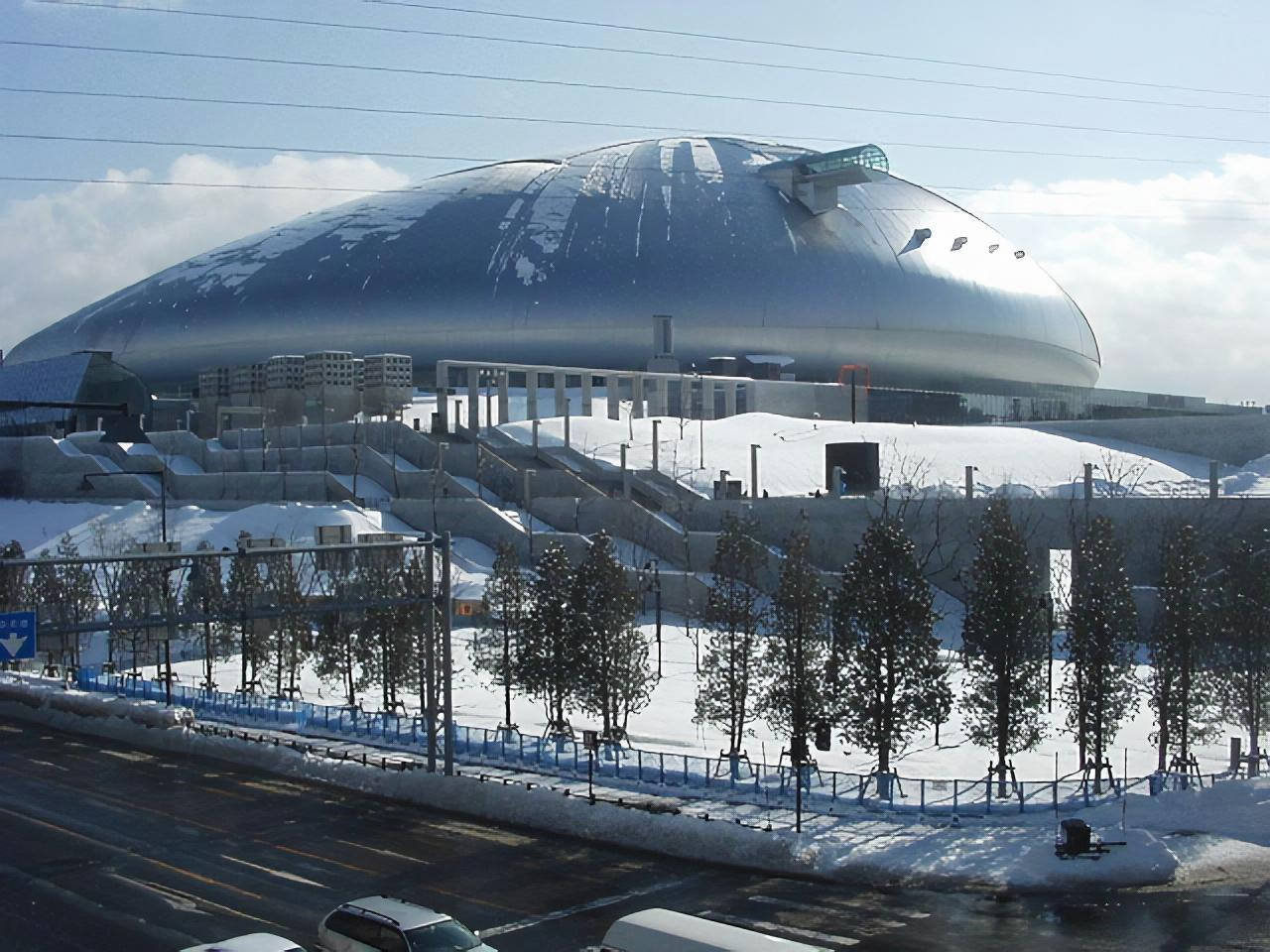
The Sapporo Dome in winter

The Sapporo Dome was constructed in 2001 and currently hosts the local professional football team, Hokkaido Consadole Sapporo.

ES CON Field Hokkaido (エスコンフィールド北海道, Esukon Fīrudo Hokkaidō), a baseball park in Kitahiroshima, Hokkaido, is home to Nippon Professional Baseball's Hokkaido Nippon-Ham Fighters and opened in March 2023. From 2004 to 2022, the Fighters called Sapporo Dome home.

==== Winter sports ====
Sapporo was selected as host of the 5th Winter Olympics, scheduled for February 3 to 12, 1940; however, Japan had to cancel the event, thereby handing the decision back to the IOC after the Second Sino-Japanese War broke out in 1937.

In 1972, Sapporo hosted the 11th Winter Olympics. Some structures built for Olympic events remain in use today, including the ski jumps at Miyanomori and Okurayama. After considering a bid for the 2026 Winter Olympics and the 2030 Winter Olympics, Olympic representatives in Sapporo have said that the city is considering a bid for the 2034 Winter Olympics. The city predicted it may cost as much as 456.5 billion yen ($4.3 billion) to host the games and is planning to have 90 percent of the facilities within half an hour of the Olympic village, according to a report published on 12 May 2016. The Alpen course would be in Niseko, the world's second-snowiest resort, while the village would be next to the Sapporo Dome, the report said. The plans were presented to the Japanese Olympic Committee on 8 November 2016. In 2002, Sapporo hosted three group matches of the FIFA World Cup at the Sapporo Dome. In 2006, Sapporo hosted some games of the 2006 Basketball World Championship and also for the 2006 Women's Volleyball World Championship. In 2007, Sapporo hosted the FIS Nordic World Ski Championships at the Sapporo Dome, Miyanomori ski jump, Okurayama ski jump, and the Shirahatayama cross-country course. It has been the host city to two Asian Winter Games and hosted the 2017 Asian Winter Games in Obihiro. Sapporo also hosted matches during the 2019 Rugby World Cup.

Skiing remains a major sport in Sapporo, with almost all children learning to ski as part of the school curriculum. Okurayama Elementary School is unusual for having its own ski hill and ski-jumping hill on the school grounds. Within the city are commercial ski hills, including Moiwayama, Bankeiyama, KobaWorld, Sapporo Teine, and Fu's.

Many sports stadiums and domes are located in Sapporo, and some have been designated as venues for sports competitions. The Sapporo Community Dome, also known as "Tsu-Dome", has hosted the Golden Market, a large flea market held twice a year, as well as sports events. The Makomanai Ice Arena, in Makomanai Park, was one of the venues of the Sapporo Olympics in 1972. It was renamed the Makomanai Sekisuiheim Ice Arena in 2007, when Sekisui Chemical Co., Ltd., acquired naming rights and renamed the arena after their real estate brand. Other large sports venues include the Makomanai Open Stadium, Tsukisamu Dome, Maruyama Baseball Stadium, and the Hokkaido Prefectural Sports Center, which hosts the professional basketball team, Levanga Hokkaido.

Toyota Big Air was a major international snowboarding event held annually in Sapporo Dome.

==== Professional sport teams ====
Club	Sport	League	Venue	Established
Hokkaido Nippon-Ham Fighters	Baseball	Nippon Professional Baseball	Es Con Field Hokkaido	2004
Levanga Hokkaido	Basketball	B.League Division 1	Hokkaido Prefectural Sports Center, Tsukisamu Dome	2006
Hokkaido Consadole Sapporo	Football (soccer)	J2 League	Sapporo Atsubetsu Park Stadium, Sapporo Dome	1996

- J.League – Hokkaido Consadole Sapporo (J1 in 1998, 2001–2002, 2008, 2012, 2017–present; J2 in 1999–2000, 2003–2007, 2009–2011, 2013–2016).
- NPB – Hokkaido Nippon Ham Fighters in Pacific League

=== Video games ===
- Yakuza 5
- Persona 5 Strikers
- Pokémon Diamond and Pearl, Pokémon Platinum and Pokémon Legends: Arceus, Jubilife City, the capital of the Sinnoh region, is based on Sapporo.

== Education ==
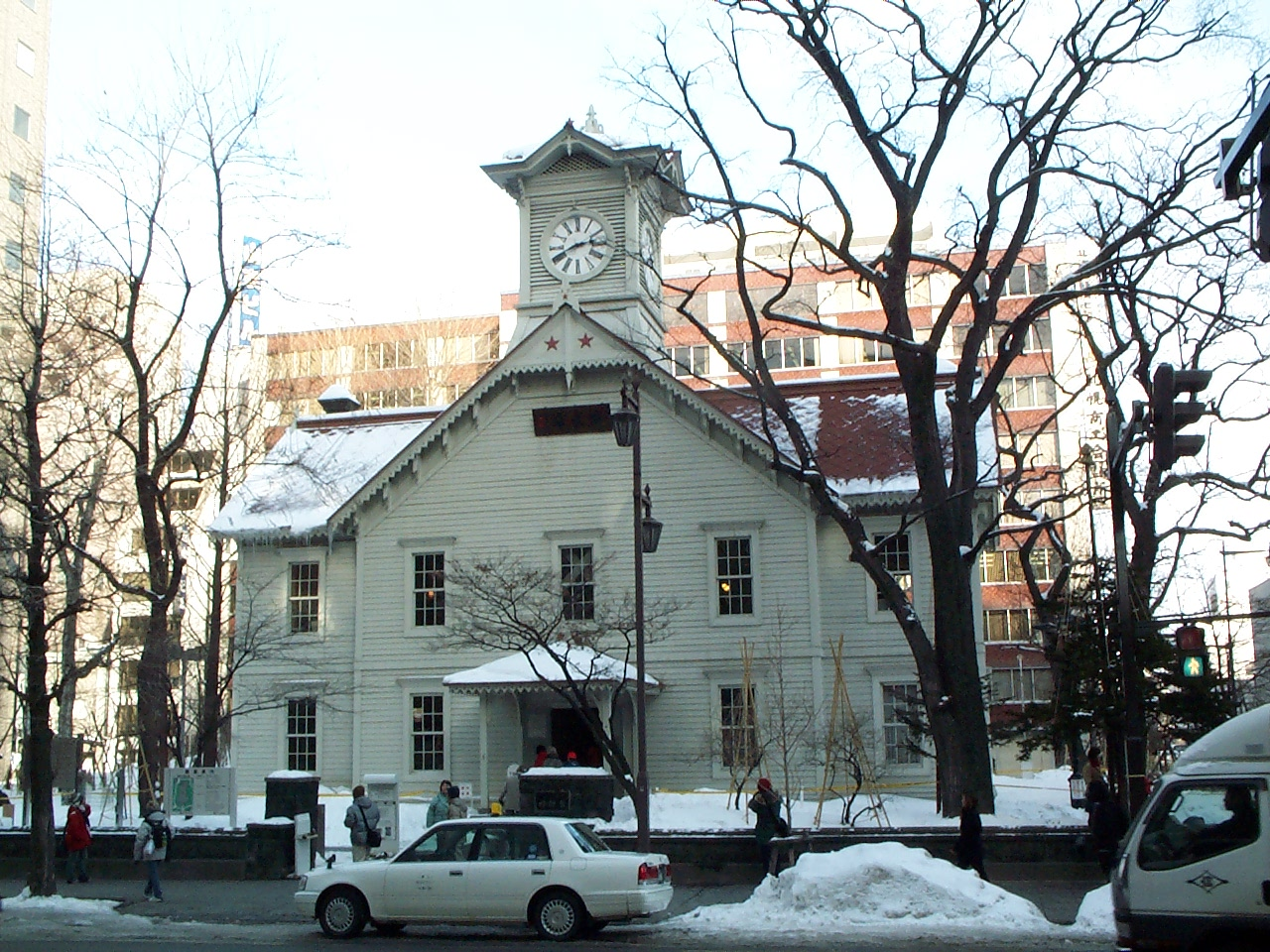
The Sapporo Clock Tower, formerly a part of Hokkaido University in the 19th century

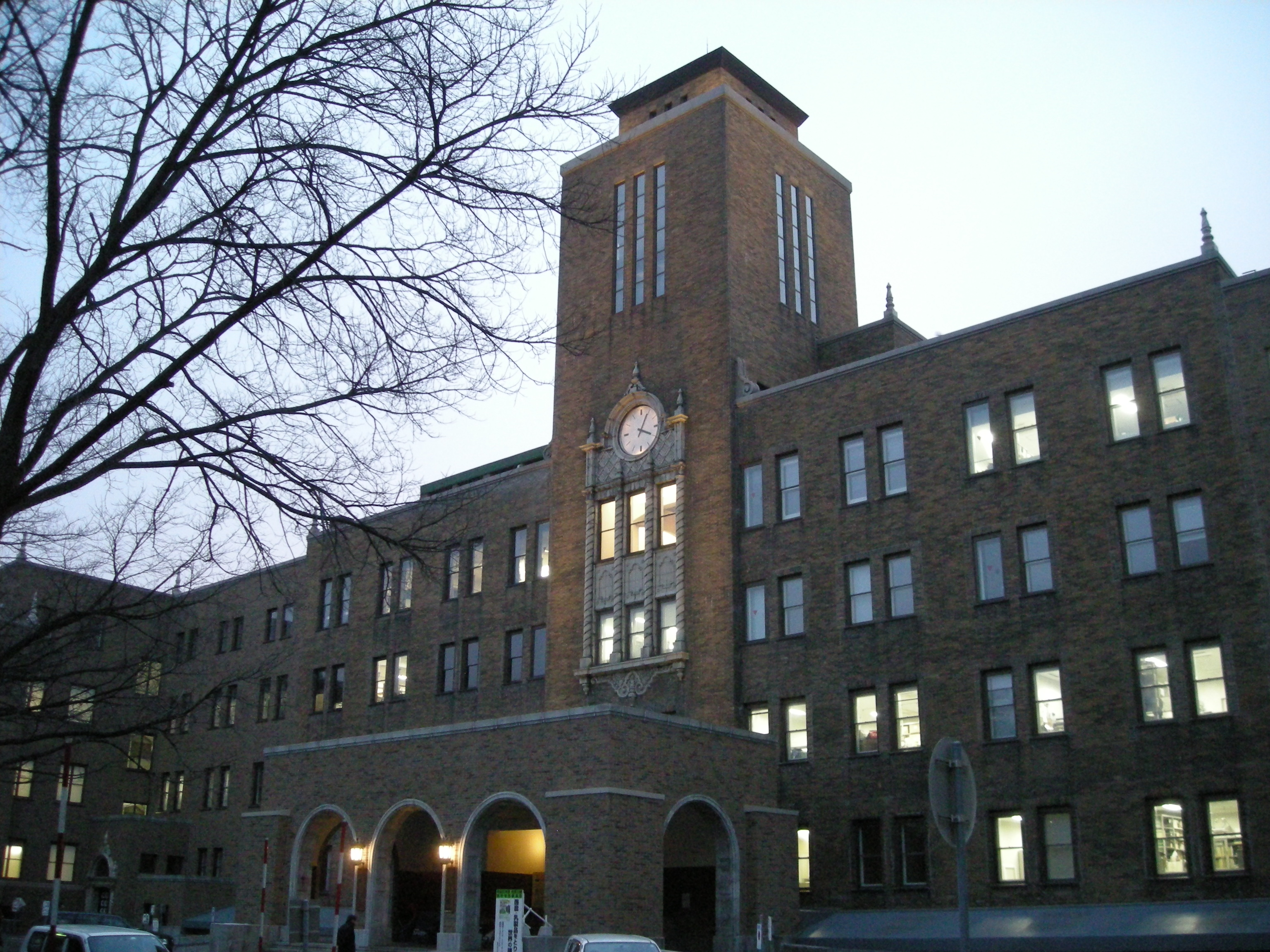
Hokkaido University

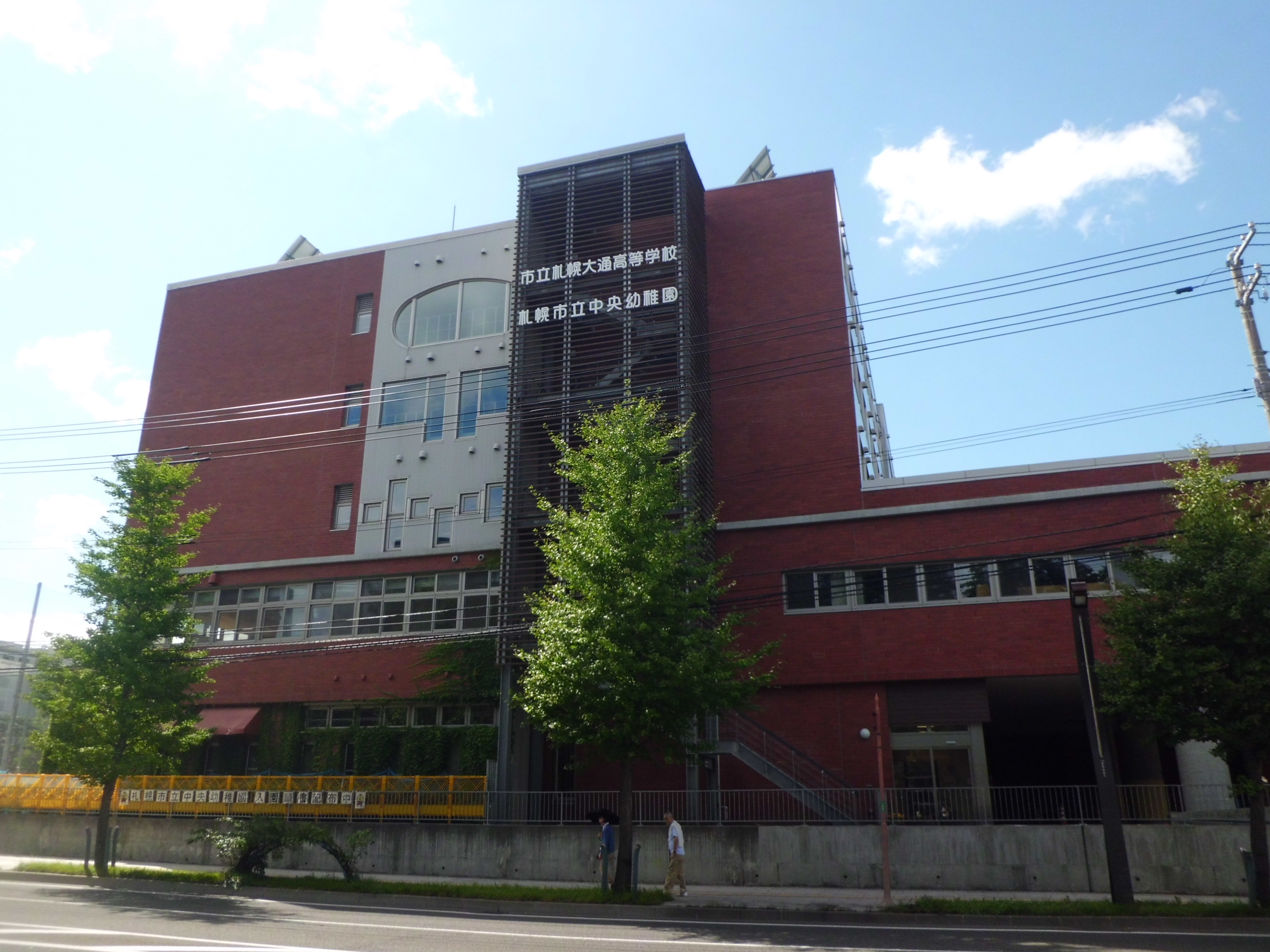
Sapporo Odori High School

=== Universities ===
National

- Hokkaido University
- Hokkaido University of Education

See Japanese national university

Public

- Sapporo City University
- Sapporo Medical University

Private

- Fuji Women's University
- Health Sciences University of Hokkaido
- Hokkai School of Commerce
- Hokkai Gakuen University
- Hokkaido Bunkyo University
- Hokkaido College of Pharmacy
- Hokkaido Institute of Technology
- Hokkaido Musashi Women's Junior College
- Hokkaido University of Science
- Hokkaido Tokai University
- Hokusei Gakuen University
- Japan Health Care College
- Koen Gakuen Women's Junior College
- Sapporo International University
- Sapporo Ōtani University
- Sapporo University
- Sapporo University of Health Sciences
- Tenshi College

=== Primary and secondary schools ===
There are 198 municipal elementary schools and 98 municipal junior high schools in Sapporo. Sapporo Odori High School provides Japanese-language classes to foreign and Japanese returnee students, and the school has special admissions quotas for these groups.

The city has two private international schools:

- Hokkaido International School
- Hokkaido Korean Primary, Middle and High School (North Korean school)

== Twin towns and sister cities ==
=== Sister cities ===
==== International ====
Sapporo has twinning relationships with several cities worldwide.

City	Country	State	Since
Portland	United States	Oregon	November 17, 1959
Munich	Germany	Bavaria	August 28, 1972
Shenyang	China	Liaoning	November 18, 1980
Denver	United States	Colorado	September 1982
Novosibirsk	Russia	Novosibirsk Oblast	June 13, 1990
Daejeon	South Korea	South Chungcheong	October 22, 2010

Sapporo also cooperates with:

City	Country	State
Balikpapan	Indonesia	East Kalimantan
Brisbane	Australia	Queensland
Davao City	Philippines	Davao Region
Seattle	United States	Washington

==== Domestic ====
City	Prefecture	Region	Since
Hamamatsu	(Shizuoka Prefecture) Shizuoka	Chūbu region	May 14, 2009
Matsumoto	(Nagano Prefecture) Nagano	Chūbu region	September 6, 2010
Kagoshima	(Kagoshima Prefecture) Kagoshima	Kyūshū region	November 16, 2013

== Notable people ==
- Seiichi Endo, participant in the Tokyo subway sarin attack
- Satoru Iwata, 4th president of Nintendo
- Satoshi Kon, animator and film director
- Yu Owada, known by ring name Owadasan, professional wrestler

== In popular culture ==
- In the Pokémon franchise, Jubilife City, a location in the Sinnoh region, was based on Sapporo. In Pokémon Legends: Arceus, the Galaxy Hall was designed after the Former Hokkaidō Government Office.
- The Manic Street Preachers song Still Snowing in Sapporo from the band's 2021 album The Ultra Vivid Lament makes reference to Sapporo.

== See also ==
- List of cities in Japan
- Sapporo Brewery
