= Sapporo Art Park =

- 札幌芸術の森
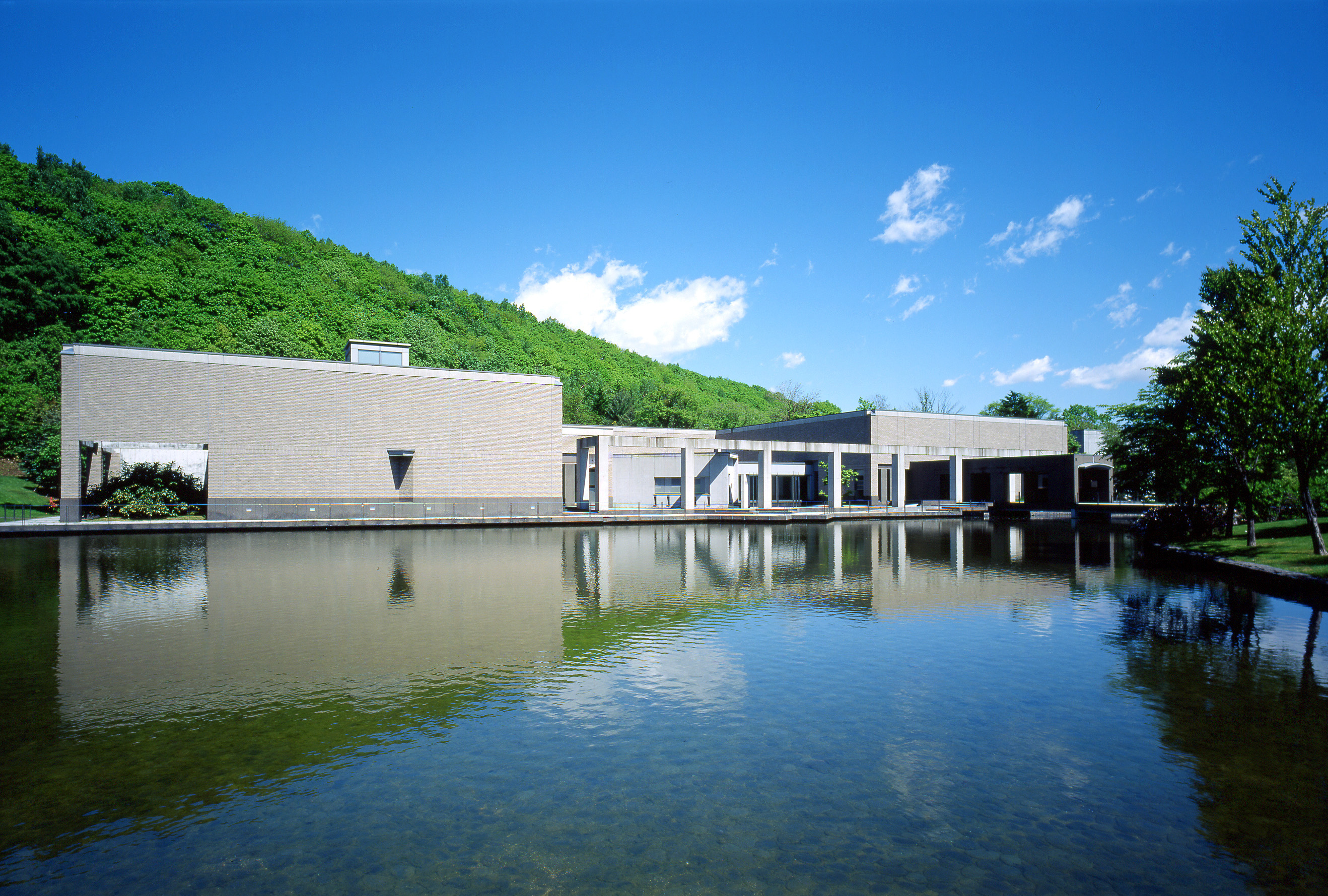

- Location within Hokkaido Location within Japan

General information
- Location: 005-0864 2-75, Geijutsunomori, Minami-ku, Sapporo-shi, Sapporo, Hokkaidō, Japan
- Coordinates: 42°56′50″N 141°10′54″E
- Opened: 27 July 1986

Website
- Official website

Sapporo Art Park (札幌芸術の森, Sapporo Geijutsu no Mori) is an open-air complex of sites in Minami-ku, Sapporo, dedicated to visual and performing art exhibits and facilities. Constructed in 1986, the park was established "to cultivate unique new culture in Sapporo and create an environment in which the city, the arts, and culture exist in harmony with Sapporo’s natural beauty." The park is situated in the forests on the outskirts of Sapporo, close to Sapporo City University. In addition to art and sculpture displays, the park also rents out workshops, studios, and other spaces for creative arts.

== Facilities ==
=== Sapporo Art Museum ===
The Sapporo Art Museum contains changing exhibits from artists connected with Sapporo and Hokkaido, as well as other Japanese and international artists.

=== Sapporo Sculpture Garden ===
The sculpture garden is set in an expansive hilly circuit containing 74 sculptures by 64 artists. It is closed during the winter season, when a snowshoeing trail operates instead.

=== Satō Chūryō Children's Atelier ===
The works of Churyo Sato, a sculptor born in Miyagi Prefecture and educated in Hokkaido, are displayed in this atelier, which also hosts workshops for children to learn sculpting.

=== Takeo Arishima Residence ===
The residence of Takeo Arishima, a famous novelist of the late Meiji (era) and early Taishō eras, was moved to the park. Arishima was educated at Sapporo Agricultural College, now Hokkaido University, and spent many years in Sapporo, where his father owned a tenant farm. The residence contains exhibits and information about Arishima and his life. A cafe is also on the premises.

=== Outdoor Stage ===
An outdoor stage hosts live performances of classical, jazz, and other varieties of music during the summer season. It has been the site of the Sapporo Jazz Festival, among others.
