= Expo Hokkaido '82 =

International exhibition held in Japan

Expo Hokkaido '82 (Japanese: '82北海道博覧会) was an exhibition in Japan held at Tsukisamu Dome and outside fairgrounds, from June 12 - August 22, 1982.

Its theme was "Departure for the Northern Age". It received over 2.6 million visitors.

== Pavilions ==
- Theme Pavilion "Round theater The Northern Age" - Utilized Tsukisamu Dome.
- Sub theme pavilions
  - Energy Pavilion
  - Food Pavilion
  - Northern Hemisphere Pavilion
- World Bazaar
- Transportation for Tomorrow Pavilion
- Daiei Pavilion"Omnimax theater"
- Suntory Pavilion "Water Land"
- 21st Century Science Pavilion
- Environment Pavilion
- All Japan Tourism & Local Products Pavilion
- UCC Coffee Pavilion
- COOP Rainbow Pavilion
- Japan Tobacco and Salt Pavilion "Cigalt"
- Future Information Technology Pavilion
- Nature Square
  - Nikka Nature Pavilion
- Mitsui Pegasus Pavilion
- Snow Brand Pavilion
- Human Square
- Ueshima Kids Circus Pavilion
- Festival Square
- Amusement area "Family Land" - The "Loop the Loop" Shuttle roller coaster, Ferris wheels, Pirate Ship and other facilities were installed.
