= Tsukisamu Dome =

Indoor arena in Sapporo, Hokkaido, Japan

Coordinates: 43°1′38.90″N 141°24′44.95″E

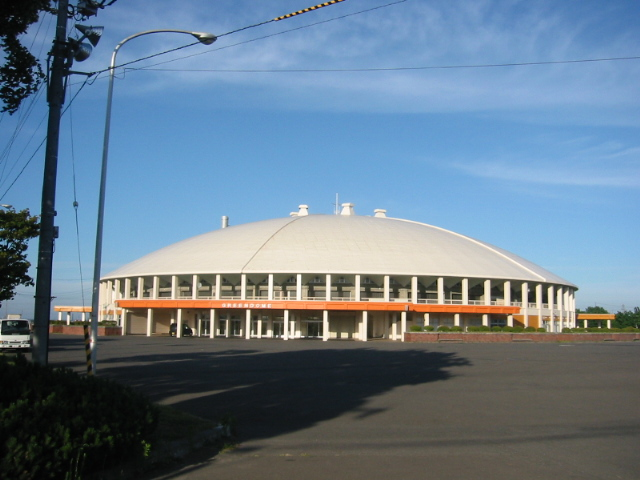
- Interactive map of Tsukisamu Dome
- Former names: Tsukisamu Green Dome; Hokkaidouritsu Sangyou Kyoushin Kaijou
- Location: Sapporo, Japan
- Owner: Hokkaido Government
- Operator: Hokkaido Sports Culture Association
- Capacity: 5,831

Construction
- Opened: 1972
- Closed: 2016
- Demolished: 2018

Tsukisamu Dome (月寒ドーム), also called Tsukisamu Green Dome (formerly called Hokkaidouritsu Sangyou Kyoushin Kaijou), was an indoor arena located in Toyohira-ku, Sapporo, Hokkaido, Japan. The full capacity of the arena was 5,831.

== Overview ==
This facility was used for agricultural shows, car exhibitions and sales, concerts, sports events, and as a convention center.

The Tsukisamu Dome was closed in 2016 and demolished in 2018, because of the increasing cost of maintenance of this aging facility.

A large-scale commercial facility developed by Daiwa Lease is scheduled to be completed in June 2019 (Reiwa 1) on 44,000 square meters of the site, and a portion of the facility will be opened as "Brunch Sapporo Tsukisamu" on July 19, 2019. It opened and fully opened on October 23 .In addition, an exhibition and trade fair venue to replace Access Sapporo is planned to be built on approximately 79,000 square meters of unused city-owned land, with completion scheduled for 2027.

== Concerts ==
On October 29, 1982, the British rock band Queen performed a concert there during the Hot Space Tour. Diana Ross performed there on November 7, 1989

== Access ==
- Tōhō Line: 15 minutes walk (to the east) from Fukuzumi Station.

== See also ==
- Expo Hokkaido '82
