= Sapporo Clock Tower =

Building in Hokkaido Prefecture, Japan

Coordinates: 43°03′45″N 141°21′13″E

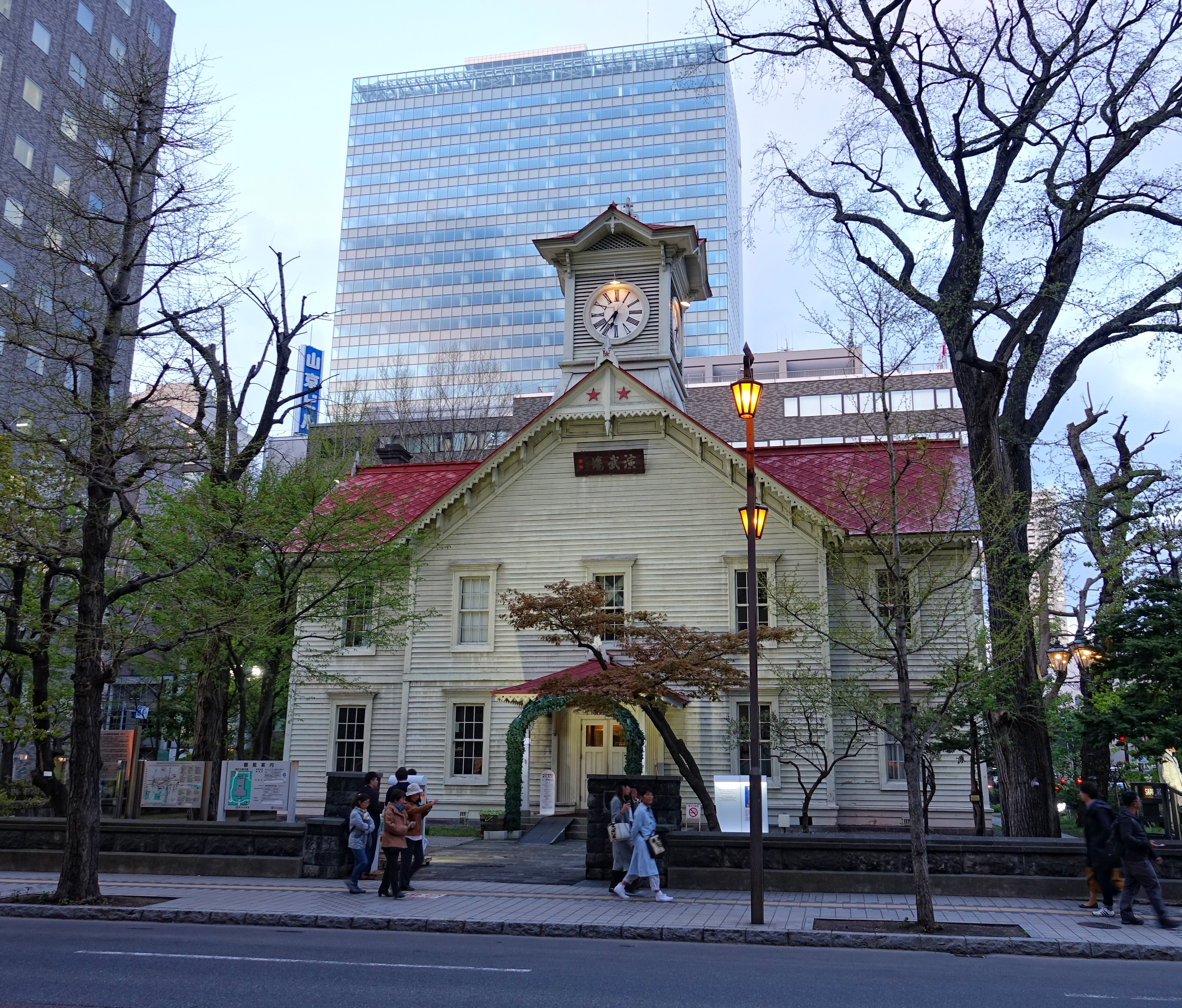
Sapporo clock tower facade

Sapporo Clock Tower (札幌時計台, Sapporo Tokeidai) is a wooden structure and tourist attraction located at North 1 West 2, Chūō-ku, Sapporo, the largest city on the island of Hokkaidō, Japan. As of 2021, this tower is the oldest clock tower in Japan.

The building is of American design and is one of the few surviving Western-style buildings in Sapporo, a city developed in the 1870s with assistance from the American government. It is known by many as the symbol of the city and is a main feature of almost all domestic and international tours of Sapporo. The clock after which it is named continues to run and keep time, and the chimes can be heard every hour.

== History ==
The tower was built in 1878, and is all that remains of the drill hall of the former Sapporo Agricultural College (now Hokkaido University). The building was one of the earliest to be built in Sapporo, which was chosen as the new administrative center of Hokkaidō in 1868, the officially recognized year celebrated as the "birth" of the city. It is the oldest building standing in Sapporo, and the oldest clock tower in Japan.

The clock was installed in July 1881 by E. Howard & Co. (headed by a co-founder of what would eventually become the Waltham Watch Company) of Boston, Massachusetts, US., and was used on 12 August 1881.

In 1970, Sapporo Clock Tower was designated an Important Cultural Property, and certified as Mechanical Engineering Heritage of Japan in 2009.

Another tower, Shinkorō (Ja辰鼓楼) located in Toyooka, Hyogo, was built in 1871 but was initially used to keep time via drum beats. It was not used as a clock tower until 8 September 1881.

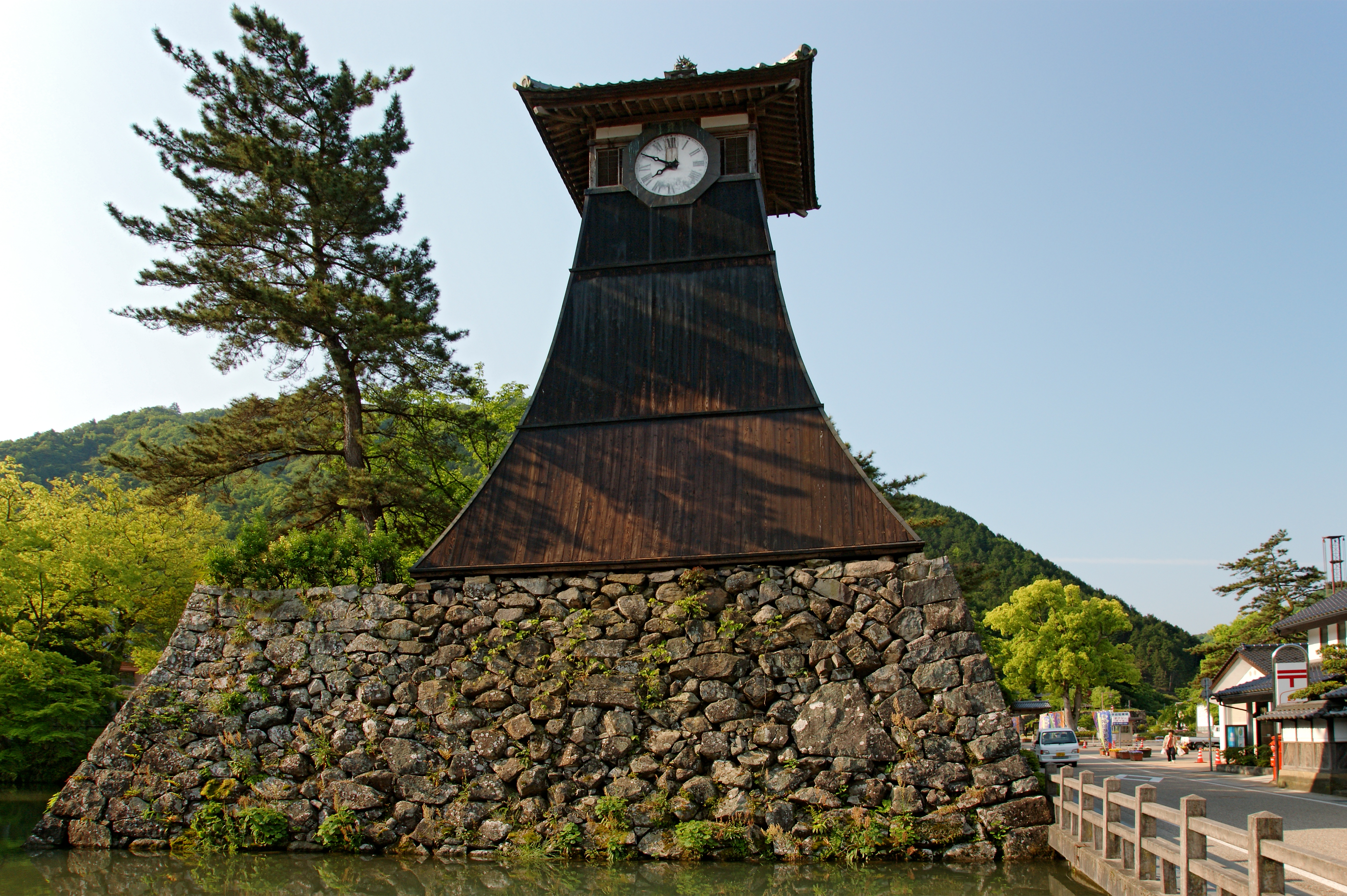
Shinkorō

== Sapporo Clock Tower now ==
The clock tower now houses a museum introducing the history of the Agricultural College and the development of Sapporo. It is open to visitors year round, but is closed on Sundays and over the New Year period. Admission is 200 yen for adults and free for children, with discounts for groups. Viewing and photographing the building is very popular among visitors to Sapporo, and visiting it forms a part of many tours of the city. It is possible for members of the public to rent the large hall upstairs for private functions, which is also occasionally used for concerts.

== See also ==
- 100 Soundscapes of Japan
