= Asahiyama Memorial Park =

Park in Sapporo, Japan

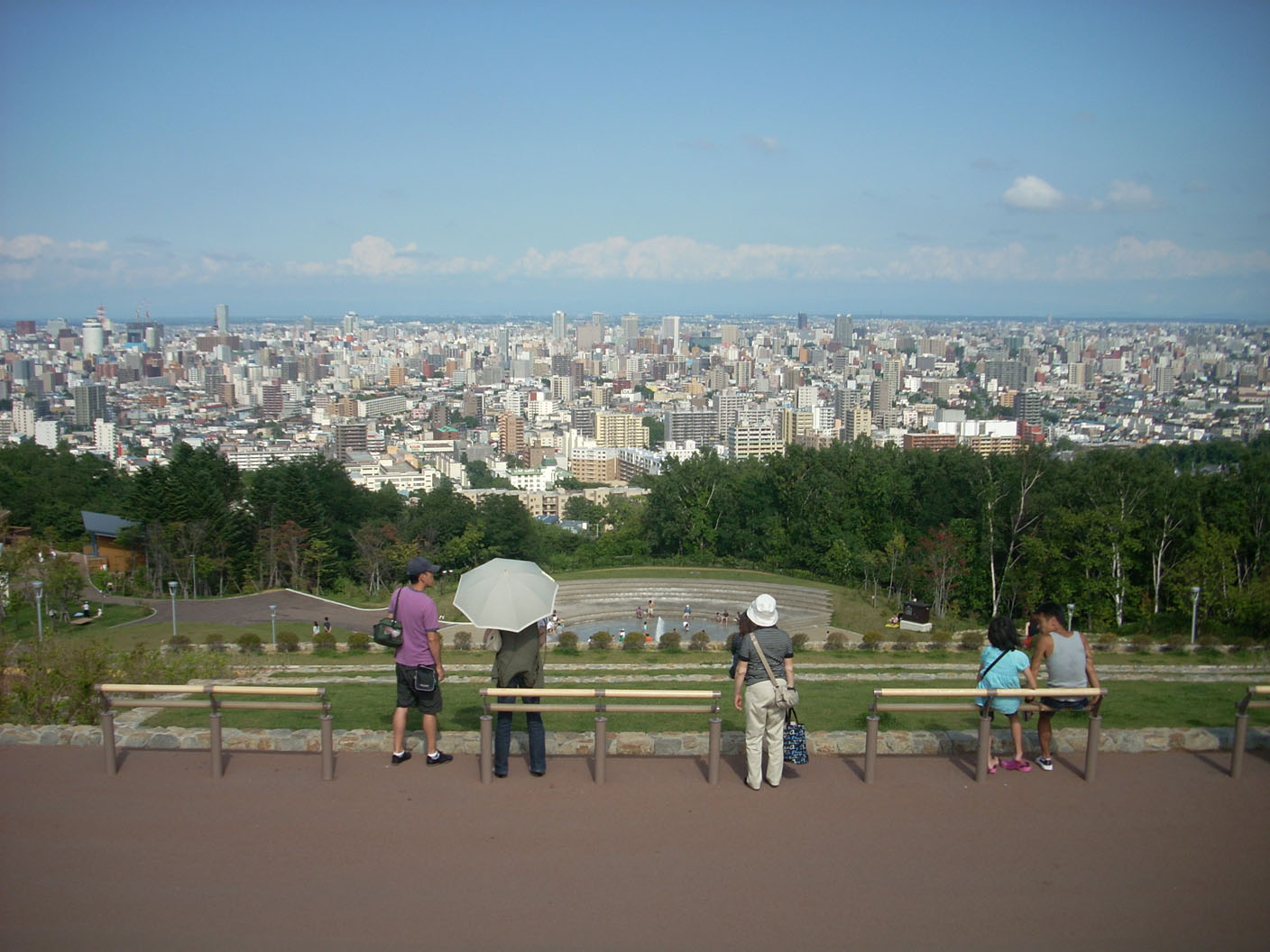
- Panoramic view from the observatory
- Interactive map of Asahiyama Memorial Park
- Location: Chūō-ku, Sapporo, Hokkaido, Japan
- Coordinates: 43.039676°N 141.315034°E
- Created: 1970

Asahiyama Memorial Park (旭山記念公園, Asahiyama Kinen Kōen) is a park located in Chūō-ku, Sapporo, Hokkaidō, Japan. The park's peak, at 137.5 metres (451 ft) above sea level, offers a great panoramic view of Sapporo, and the Sea of Japan beyond.

== History ==
Prior to the construction of Maruyama Park, the area was the site of a farm, and later Sapporo Onsen. In 1946 ownership of the property was donated to Sapporo city. Twenty years later, in 1966, the park was taking form, when over 5,500 trees were planted. The park was finally opened in 1970 to commemorate Sapporo's 100th anniversary.

Since 2004 the park was closed for redevelopment; the entire fountain and the square around it, were built in those years; it was reopened on April 29, 2009.

== Overview ==
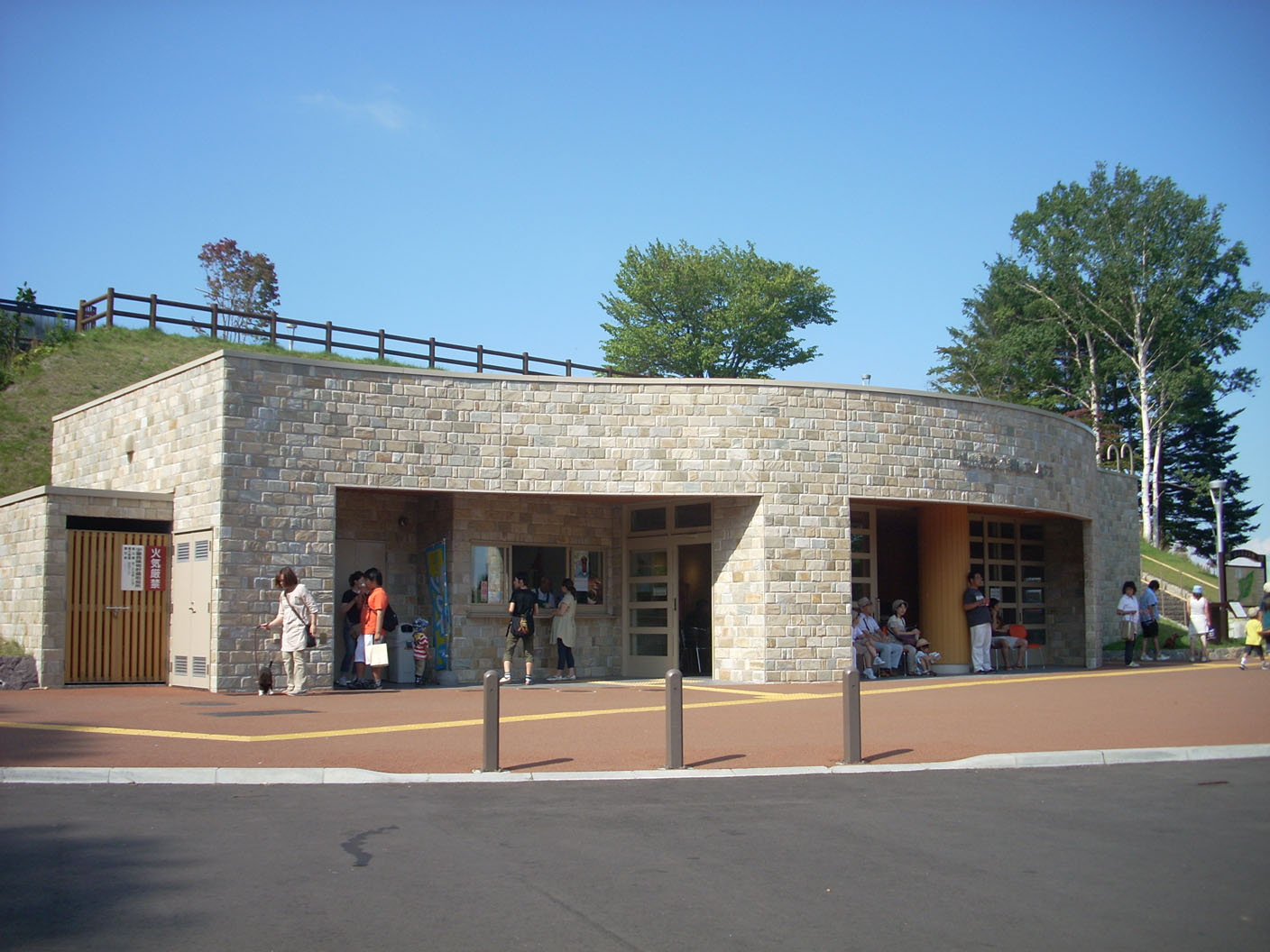
Rest House inside the park

Located in the western extremity of Sapporo, the park's lookout, located 137.5 m above sea level, is surrounded by sculpted gardens with a large lawn, fountain, a terraced Italian flowerbed, French geometric garden and Chinese arbor. Surrounding these are the Learning Forest, which offers hiking paths, with the background of Ezo alder, Ezo spruce, magnolia and false acacia trees.

The Asahiyama Memorial Park also contains a rest house, food and drink stands, a hanging bridge, playground, and space for kids. At night the illuminated fountain and lights of the buildings in central Sapporo beyond, create a popular spot for couples to enjoy the night views of Sapporo.

The park is also the venue of the Sapporo Asahiyama Music Festival held every year in July, with the background of the Toyohira Hanabi.

== Access ==
- JR Bus (Nishi13): 15 minutes from Maruyama-Kōen Station (Tōzai Line) to Asahiyama Koen-mae Bus stop, plus 5 minutes walk.
