= Sapporo City University =

Coordinates: 42.9448°N 141.3430°E

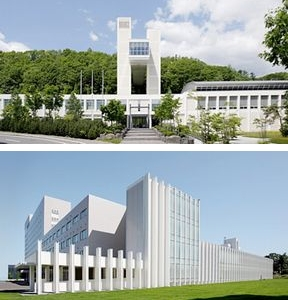
Sapporo City University

Sapporo City University (札幌市立大学, Sapporo shiritsu daigaku) is a public university with campuses in Chuo-ku and Minami-ku, Sapporo, Japan. The predecessor of the school named the Sapporo School of the Arts, was established in 1991, and it was chartered as a university in 2006 when it merged with a nursing school.

== Campus ==
- Geijutsuno-mori Campus
- Soen Campus
- Satellite Campus

== Faculties ==
- School of Design
- School of Nursing
