= Nakajima-Kōen Station =

Subway station in Sapporo, Japan

Coordinates: 43°2′55.979″N 141°21′17.964″E

N09 Nakajima-Kōen Station 中島公園駅
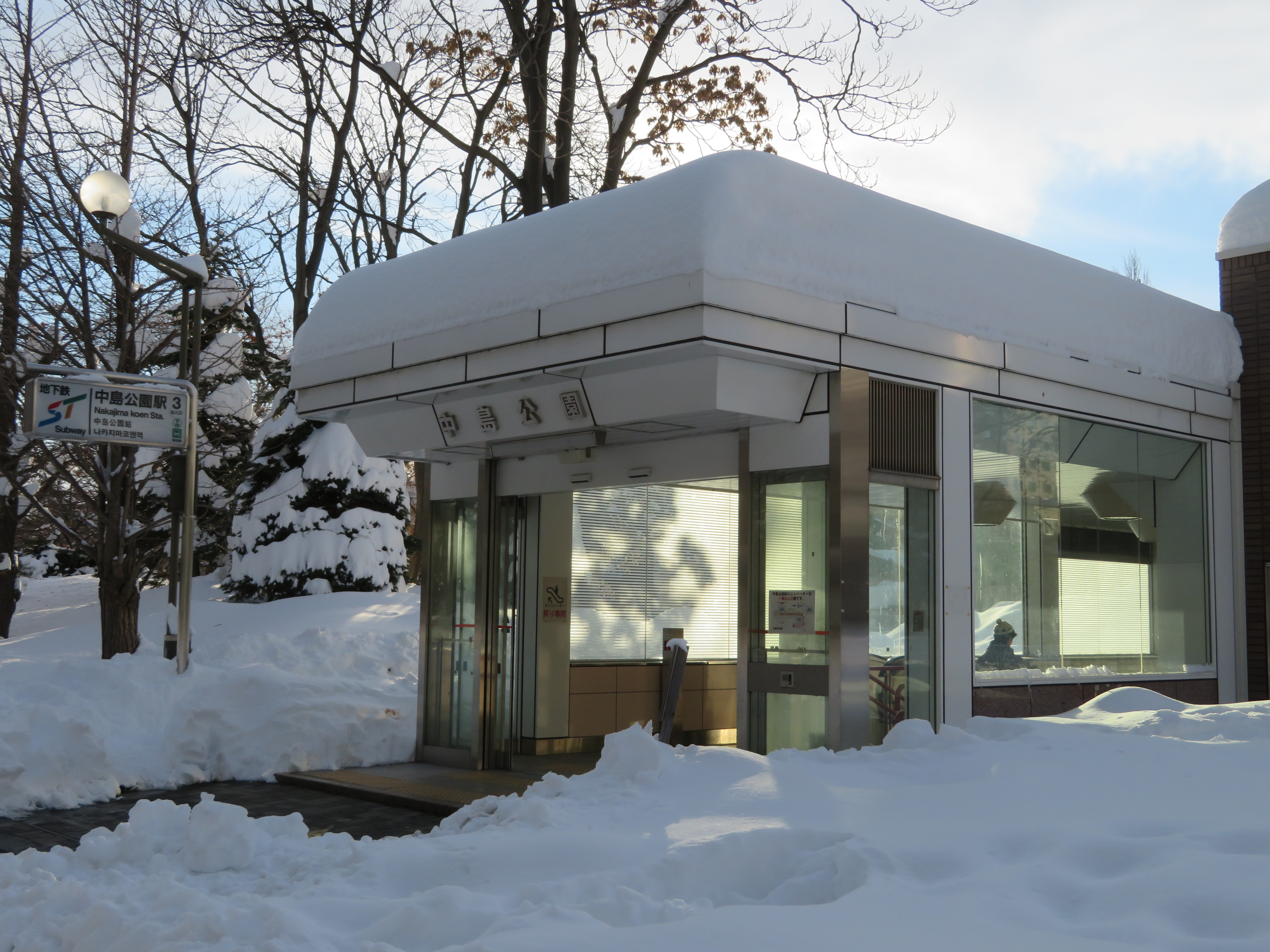
- Station entrance

General information
- Location: Chūō, Sapporo, Hokkaido; Japan
- System: Sapporo Municipal Subway station
- Operator: Sapporo City Transportation Bureau
- Line: Namboku Line
- Connections: Sapporo Streetcar Yamahana-Ku-Jō (SC20)

Construction
- Accessible: Yes

Other information
- Station code: N09

History
- Opened: December 16, 1971; 54 years ago

Passengers
- FY2014: 9,277 daily

Services
| Preceding station | Sapporo Municipal Subway | Following station |
|---|---|---|
| Susukino N08 towards Asabu | Namboku Line | Horohira-Bashi N10 towards Makomanai |
Location
- Location within Hokkaido Location within Japan

Nakajima-Kōen Station (中島公園駅) is a metro station in Chūō-ku, Sapporo, Hokkaido, Japan. The station number is N09.

The station takes its name from the Nakajima Park, located outside the station.

== Platforms ==
| 1 | Namboku Line | for Makomanai |
| 2 | Namboku Line | for Asabu |

== History ==
The station opened on 16 December 1971 coinciding with the opening of the Namboku Line from Makomanai Station to Kita-Nijuyo-Jo Station.

== Surrounding area ==
- Nakajima Park
- Sapporo Concert Hall
- Hōheikan building
- Zepp Sapporo
- Central Police Station, Nakajima
- Post Office, Nakajima
- Sapporo Park Hotel
- Kirin Beer Garden
- North Pacific Bank, Nakajima
