= Sapporo International Communication Plaza Foundation =

Japanese foundation

The Sapporo International Communication Plaza Foundation (公益財団法人札幌国際プラザ, Kōeki Zaidan Hōjin Sapporo Kokusai Puraza), or SICPF, is an organization that aims to promote international events and projects and facilitate cultural exchanges in order to revitalize the local economy. Its headquarters is located in Chūō-ku, Sapporo, Hokkaido, Japan.

== Basic Information ==
The SICPF was established in 1991 by the Hokkaido District Transport Bureau and government of Hokkaido under the "3C principle" — Communication, Convention, Citizen — in order to gain the support and participation of local people and institutions.

== Major Activities ==
- Promoting international exchange and cooperation in various fields.
- Promoting multiculturalism and cross cultural understandings in city planning.
- Fostering the development of human resources needed to successfully carry out international exchanges.
- Conveying to the world the attractiveness of Sapporo as an international city.
- Engaging in other efforts beyond those mentioned above, when considered necessary to attain the Plaza's objectives.
