= Nitori Culture Hall =

Arts and concert venue

Coordinates: 43°03′39″N 141°20′18″E

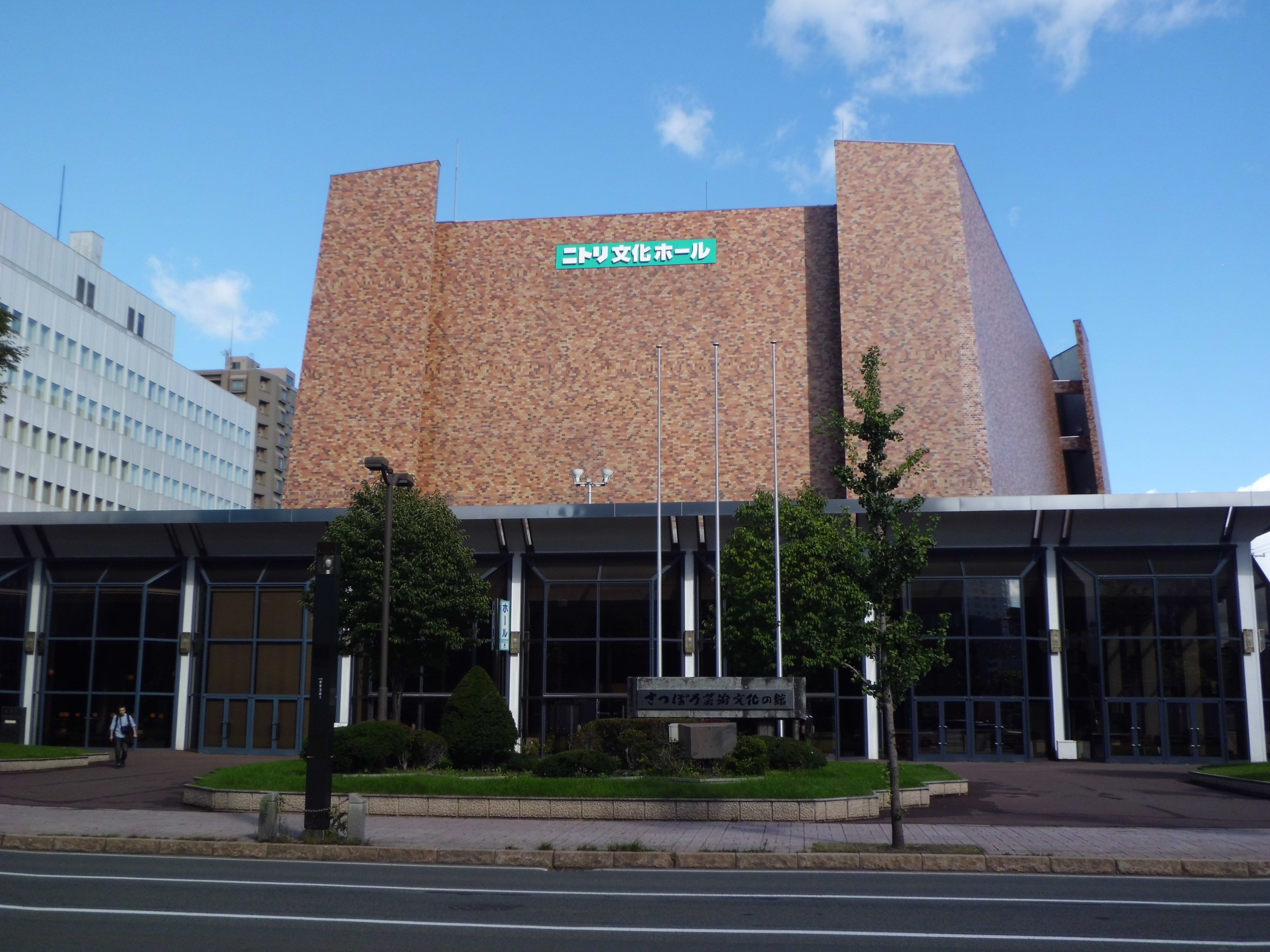
- Outside view
- Interactive map of Nitori Culture Hall
- Former names: Hokkaido Kōsei Nenkin Kaikan
- Location: Kita 1 Nishi 12, Chūō-ku, Sapporo, Hokkaidō
- Capacity: 2,300 (main hall)
- Type: Concert Hall

Construction
- Opened: 1971
- Renovated: 2009

Website
- www.sapporo-geibun.jp

Nitori Culture Hall (originally known as Hokkaido Kōsei Nenkin Kaikan) is an arts and concert venue, part of the Sapporo Geibunkan complex, located in Chūō-ku, Sapporo, Japan. It opened in 1971 as Hokkaido Kōsei Nenkin Kaikan; the complex includes a conference hall, a hotel and a concert hall.

The main concert hall has a seating capacity of 2,300. Since 2010, the furniture company Nitori owns the naming rights of the venue. Notable past performers include Santana, Cheap Trick, Whitesnake, King Crimson and Scorpions.

== Access ==
- Tozai Line: 4 minutes walk from Nishi-Jūitchōme Station.
