= Nakajima Park =

City park in Sapporo, Hokkaido, Japan

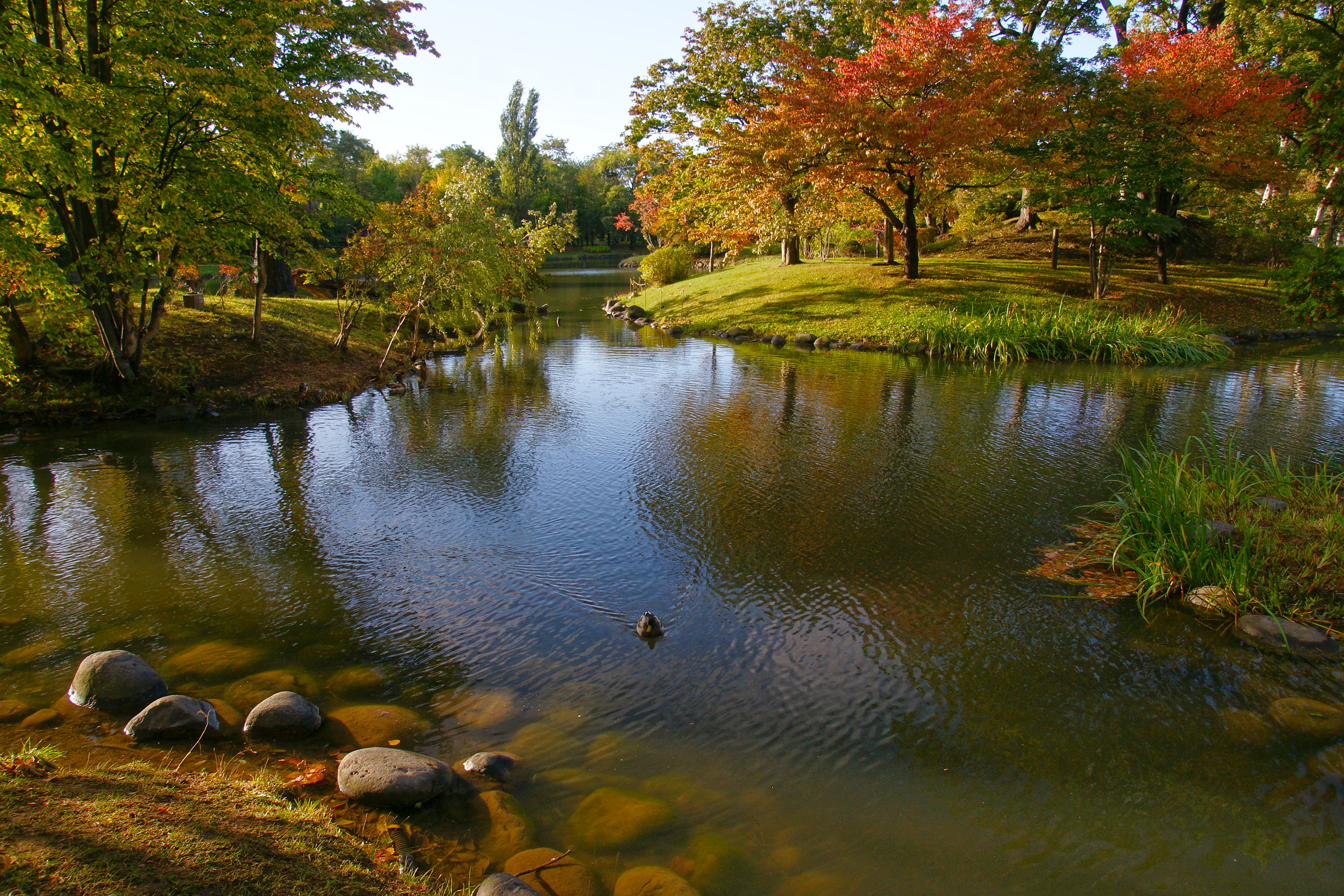
- Interactive map of Nakajima Park
- Location: Chūō-ku, Sapporo, Hokkaido, Japan
- Coordinates: 43.047346°N 141.354378°E
- Area: 21 hectares (52 acres)
- Created: 1887

Nakajima Park (中島公園, Nakajima Kōen) is a city park in Chūō-ku, Sapporo, Hokkaido, Japan. The park has a lake, two streams, a museum, a concert hall, an observatory, a historical building housing a tea shop, and several lawns and forests. At the south end, there are two shrines.

== Overview ==
The park has about 5,000 trees, including Japanese red spruce, yew, ginkgo, Sargent's cherry, black acacia, and Japanese elm.

The largest feature of the park is Shobu Pond, located near the center of the park.

The park contains the Sapporo Concert Hall, also known as "Kitara". Opened on 1997, it is the largest concert hall in Hokkaido, and houses a large main hall, small chamber music hall, and rehearsal rooms. A restaurant, nursery room, and museum shop are also located in the building.

The Sapporo Astronomical Observatory, Nakajima Sports Center, Puppet Theatre, Children's Hall, Hokkaido Museum of Literature, a Japanese Garden, Hasso-an (tea house), and Hōheikan, (historical building and wedding venue), are among the attractions of the Park.

The park also contains some sports grounds (tennis courts). These are open between April and November every year. The park is also popular for boating in summer, on the Shobu Pond, and cross-country skiing in winter.

== History ==
Prior to the construction of Nakajima Park, in 1874, a sluice gate was constructed on the Kamokamo River and a lumberyard was open. Lumber felled from the mountain were stored in the lumberyard before being floated down the Toyohira River. In 1887, the lumberyard and its surrounded area, were converted into an amusement park.

In 1957, Nakajima Park officially became a City Park.

== Access ==
- Namboku Line: Nakajima-Kōen Station and Horohira-Bashi Station
- Sapporo Streetcar: Nakajima-Kōen-Dōri Station

== Gallery ==
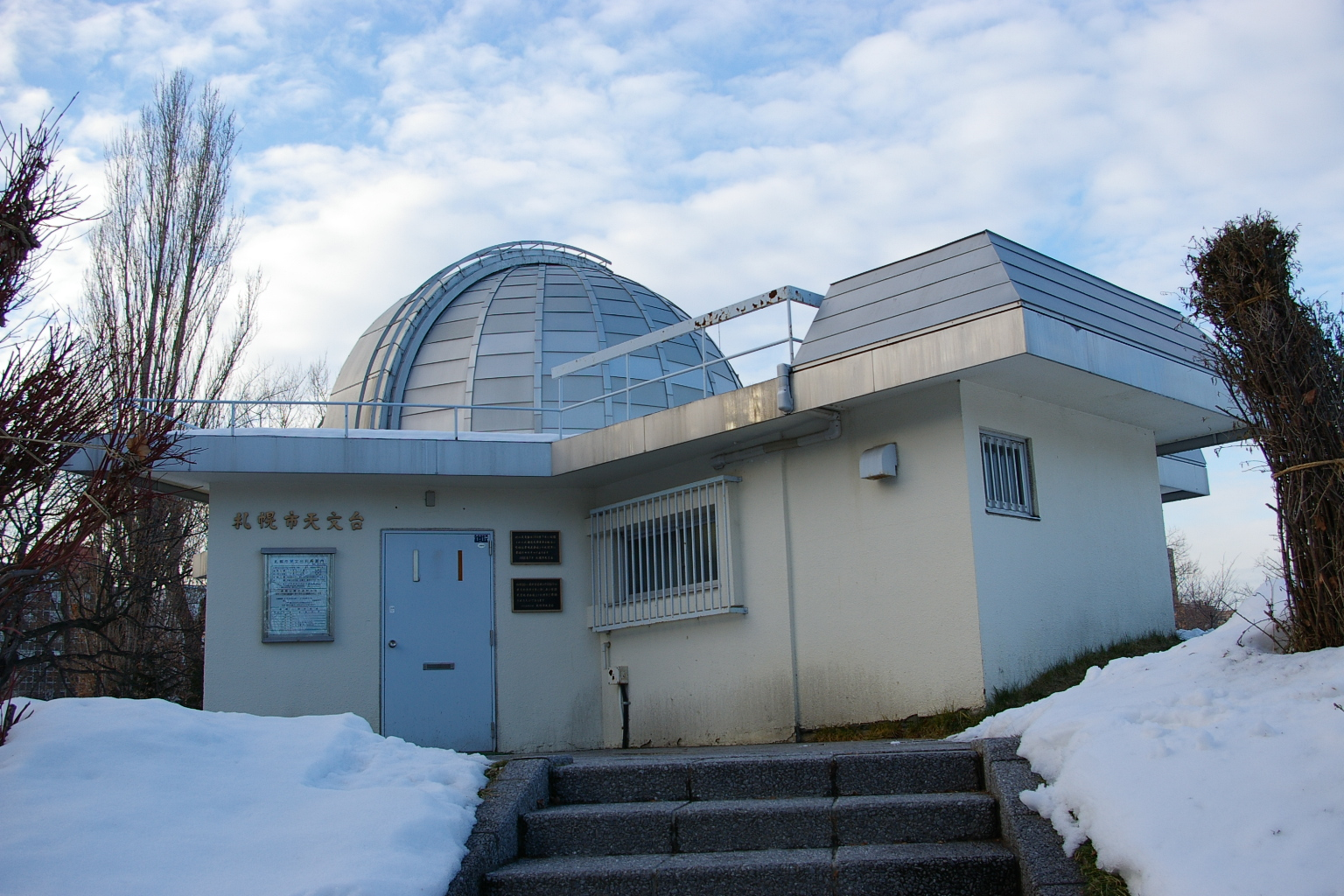
Astronomical observatory inside the park

Boat boarding area at the pond in the park

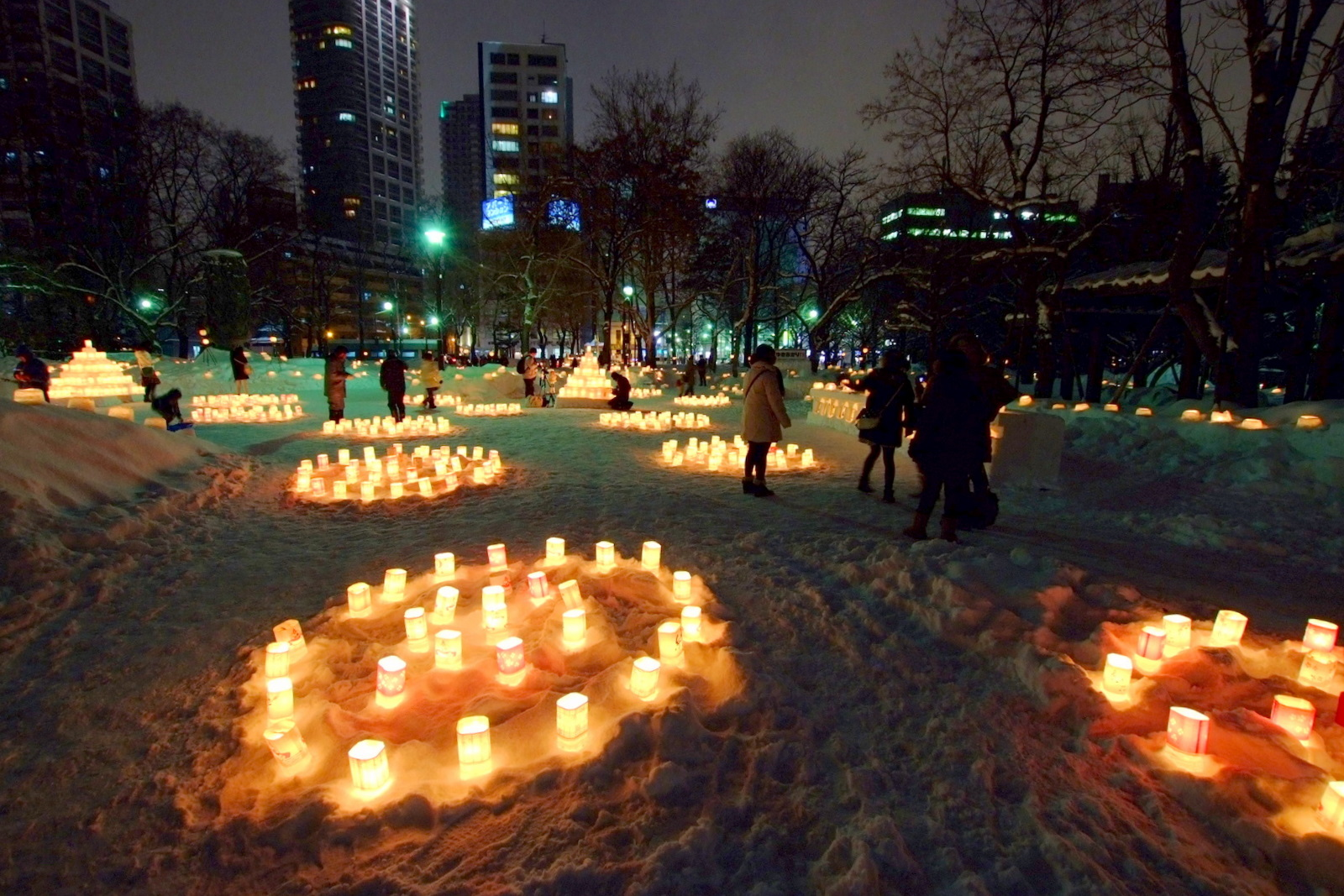
Snow lights in the park

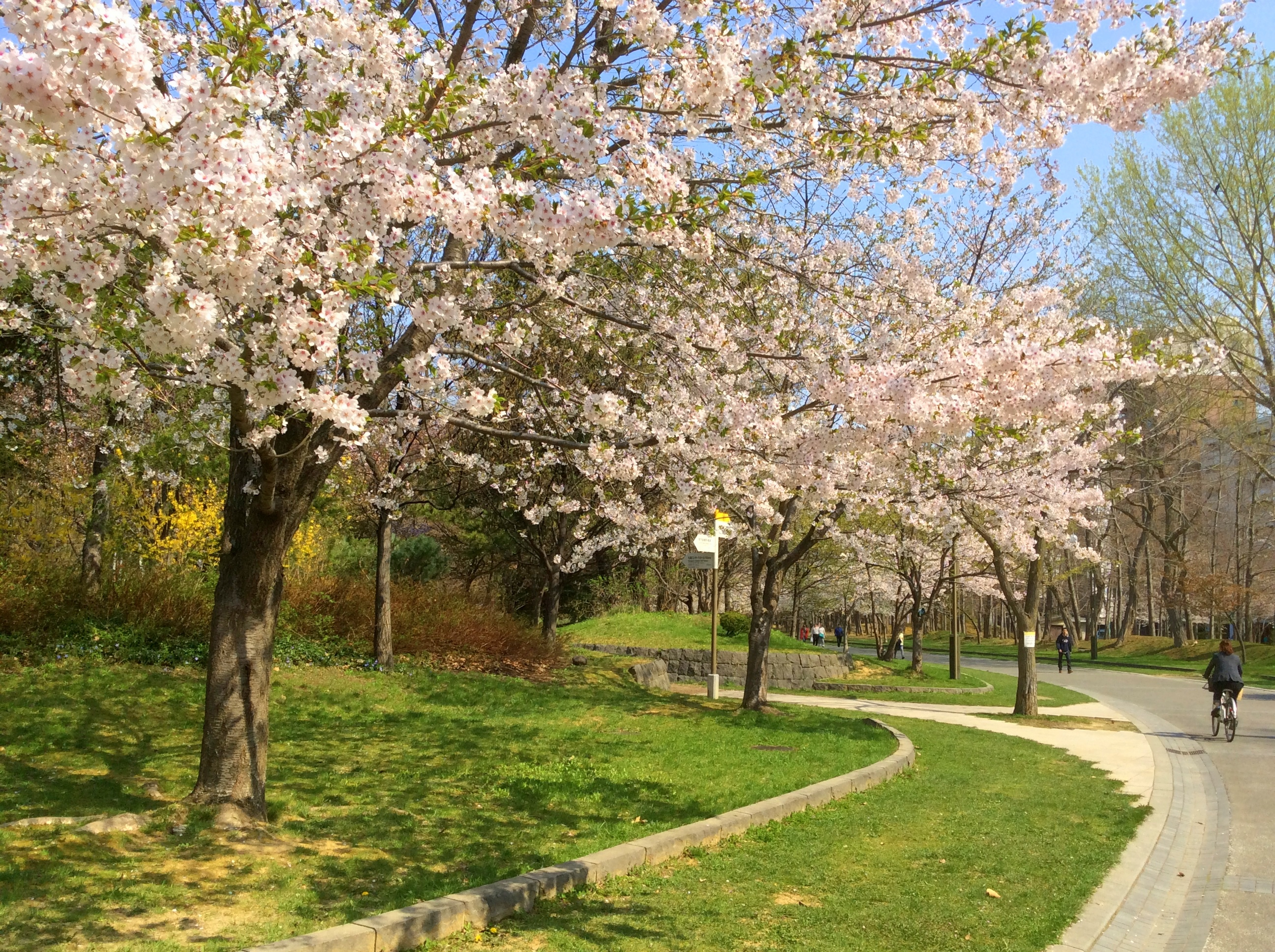
Spring in the park

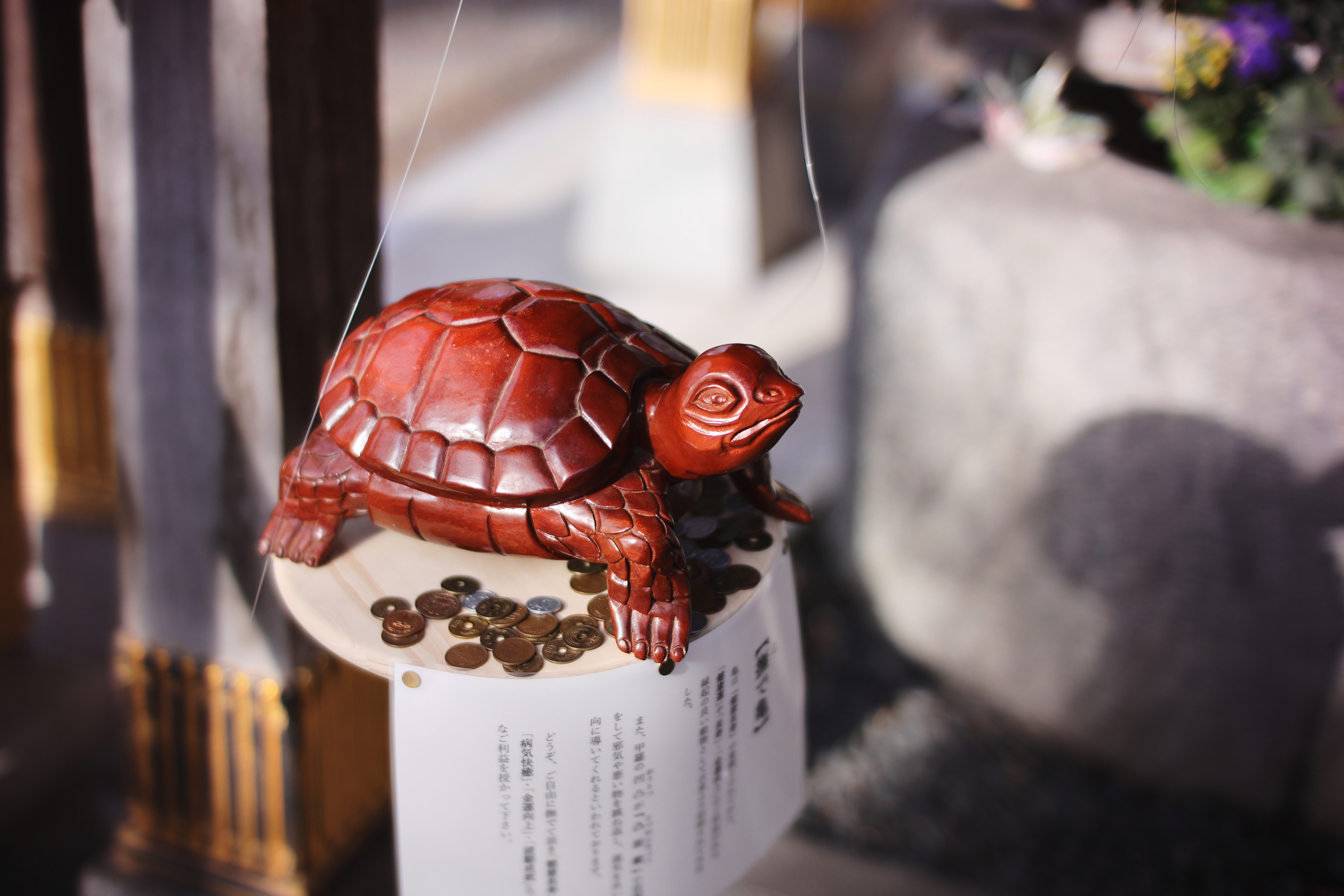
A turtle wood craft in the park
