= Hongō Shin Memorial Museum of Sculpture, Sapporo =

Japanese museum in Sapporo

- 本郷新記念札幌彫刻美術館
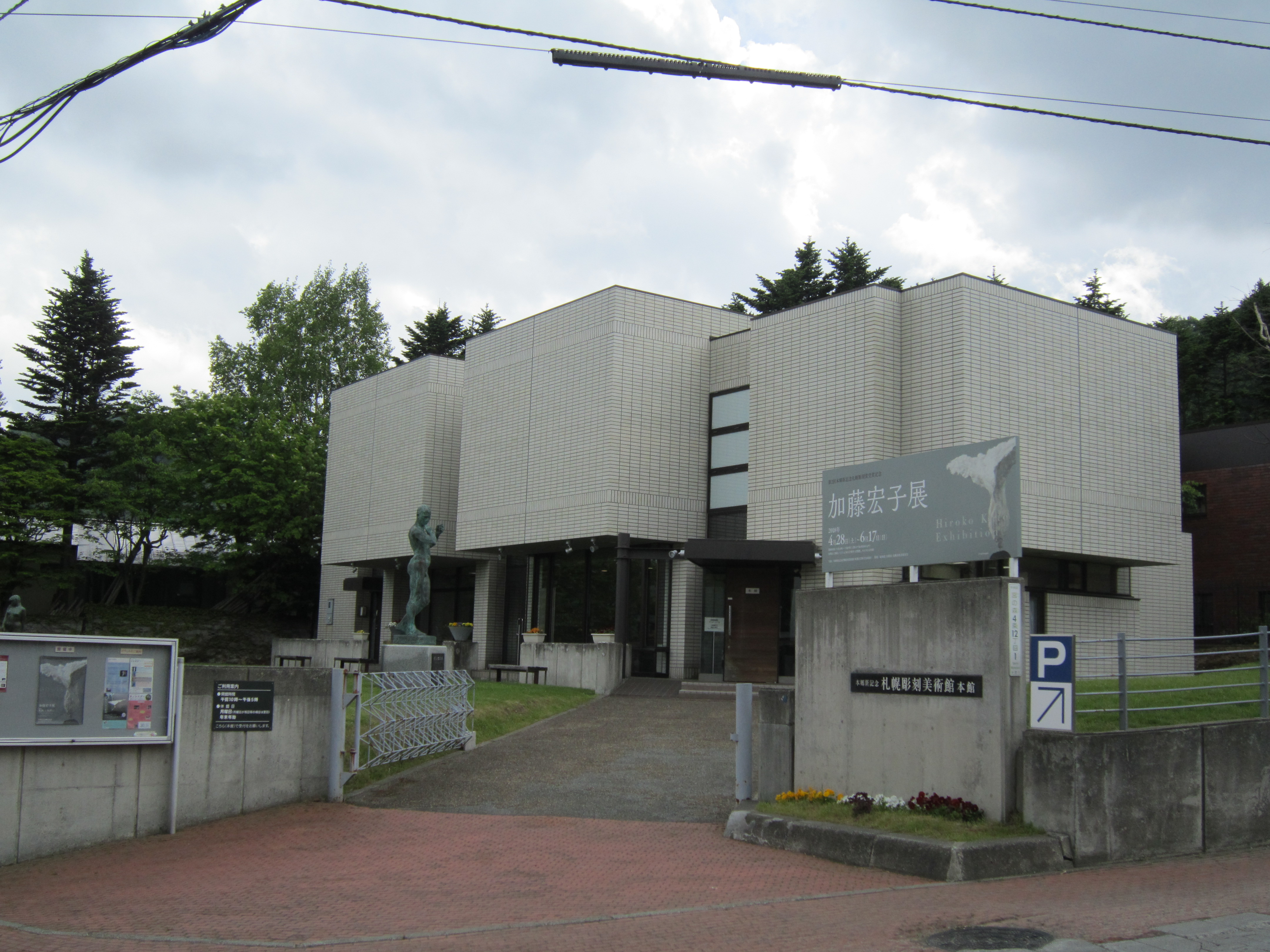
- Interactive map of the Hongō Shin Memorial Museum of Sculpture, Sapporo area

General information
- Location: 12-2 Miyanomori 4-Jō, Chūō-ku, Sapporo, Hokkaidō, Japan
- Coordinates: 43°03′19″N 141°17′47″E
- Opened: 29 June 1981

Website
- Official website

The Hongō Shin Memorial Museum of Sculpture, Sapporo (本郷新記念札幌彫刻美術館, Hongō Shin Kinen Sapporo Chōkoku Bijutsukan) opened in Sapporo, Hokkaidō, Japan in 1981. In 1979, Sapporo-born sculptor Hongō Shin (本郷新) (1905–1980), donated to the city his studio and gallery, now converted into the Hongō Shin Memorial House, and many of his works. The following year, construction of a new museum began on land purchased adjacent to the Memorial House. The collection includes some 1,800 sculptures, paintings, drawings, prints, and calligraphic works by Hongō Shin, as well as books, tools, and personal items relating to him, and those of other artists collected by him.

== See also ==
- Chūō-ku (ward in Hokkaido, Japan)
- List of museums in Japan
