= Radomil Eliška =

Czech conductor (1931–2019)

Radomil Eliška (6 April 1931, Podbořany – 1 September 2019, Prague) was a Czech conductor.

== Biography ==
Eliška received his musical education on conducting by Břetislav Bakala at the Janáček Academy of Music and Performing Arts in Brno (from 1950 to 1955). Afterwards, he conducted in the Karlovy Vary Symphony Orchestra from 1960 to 1990 and worked as a conductor mainly in the domestic Czech Republic.

He taught young musicians at the Academy of Performing Arts in Prague since 1978 and became a professor of the academy in 1996.

=== In Japan ===
Eliška visited Japan for the first time in 2004, he conducted Smetana's Má vlast, Dvořák's Cello Concerto and the Symphony No. 9 at a charity concert. This performance was recorded, and caused a sensation by the broadcast on radio. Takashi Yoshimatsu, a Japanese composer and radio host, spoke very highly of his Dvořák. Tadaaki Otaka, the music director of Sapporo Symphony Orchestra also recognized his talent, and asked him to guest-conduct the orchestra.

In 2006, Eliška conducted the Rimsky-Korsakov's Scheherazade with the orchestra in Sapporo. Because the performance also gained popularity, the orchestra officially invited him as the "Principal Guest Conductor". Though he was unknown in Japan, after he earned the good reputation, he became known rapidly and took an active part in guest-conducting with Japanese orchestras.
