= Nishi-Jūhatchōme Station =

Subway station in Sapporo, Japan

Coordinates: 43°3′25.788″N 141°19′48.192″E

T07 Nishi-Jūhatchōme Station 西18丁目駅
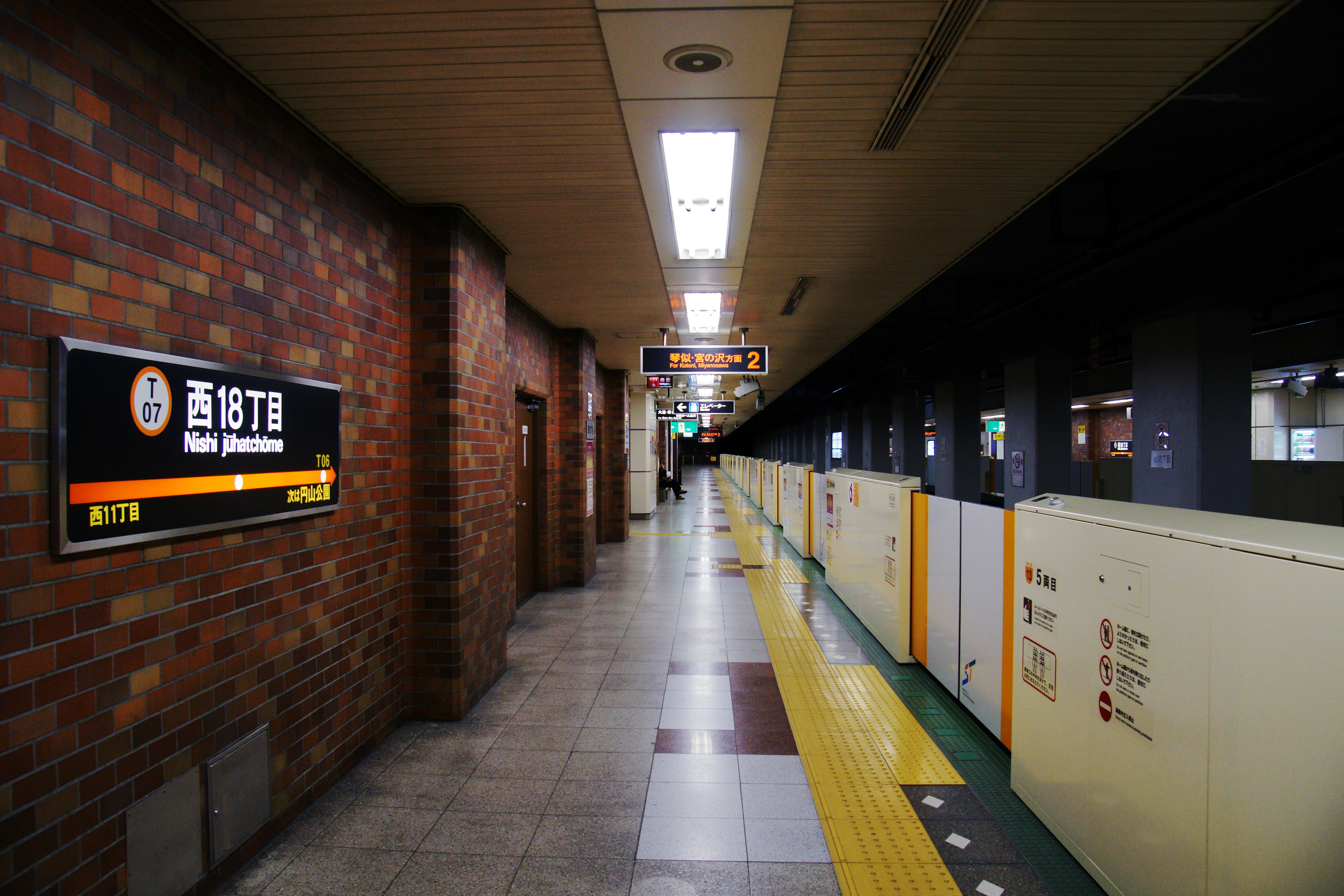
- Station platform 2

General information
- Location: Chūō, Sapporo, Hokkaido; Japan
- System: Sapporo Municipal Subway station
- Operator: Sapporo City Transportation Bureau
- Line: Tōzai Line

Construction
- Accessible: Yes

Other information
- Station code: T07

History
- Opened: 10 June 1976; 50 years ago

Services
Preceding station	Sapporo Municipal Subway	Following station
Maruyama-Kōen T06 towards Miyanosawa	Tōzai Line	Nishi-Jūitchōme T08 towards Shin-Sapporo
Location
- Location within Hokkaido Location within Japan

Nishi-Jūhatchōme Station (西18丁目駅; lit. West 18th Street) is a Sapporo Municipal Subway station in Chūō-ku, Sapporo, Hokkaido, Japan. The station number is T07.

== Platforms ==
1	■ Tōzai Line	for Shin-Sapporo
2	■ Tōzai Line	for Miyanosawa

== History ==
The station opened on 10 June 1976 coinciding with the opening of the Tozai Line from Kotoni Station to Shiroishi station.

== Surrounding area ==
- Nishi-Jūgo-Chōme Station, Sapporo Streetcar
- Sapporo Medical University
- Hokkaido Cultural Broadcasting
