= Susukino Station =

Subway and streetcar station in Sapporo, Japan

Coordinates: 43°3′20.588″N 141°21′11.90″E

N08 Susukino Station すすきの駅
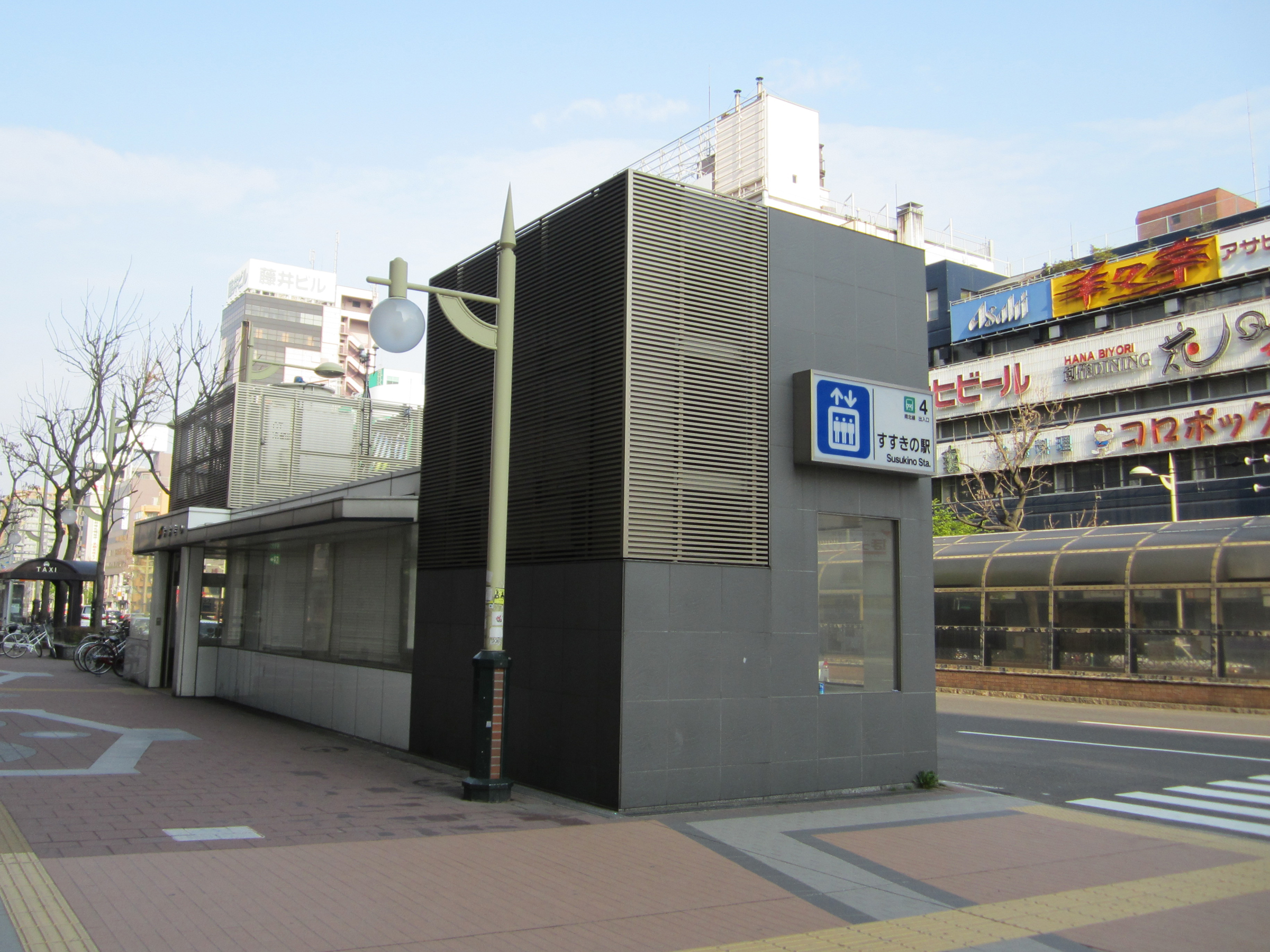
- Station exit 4

General information
- Location: Chūō-ku, Sapporo, Hokkaido; Japan
- System: Sapporo Municipal Subway station
- Operator: Sapporo City Transportation Bureau
- Lines: Namboku Line; Sapporo Streetcar

Construction
- Accessible: Yes

Other information
- Station code: N08 (Namboku Line); SC23 (Streetcar)

History
- Opened: December 16, 1971 (Subway), 1923 (Streetcar)

Passengers
- FY2014: 16,876 daily

Services
Preceding station	Sapporo Municipal Subway	Following station
Ōdōri N07 towards Asabu	Namboku Line	Nakajima-Kōen N09 towards Makomanai
Location
- Location within Hokkaido Location within Japan

Susukino Station (すすきの駅, Susukino-eki) is a railway station in Chūō-ku, Sapporo, Hokkaido, Japan. The station is numbered "N08". It is located on the Namboku Line and Sapporo Streetcar.

The station is located relatively close to Hōsui-Susukino Station on the Tōhō Line, but there are no free transfers between the two stations.

== Platforms ==
1	■ Namboku Line	for Makomanai
2	■ Namboku Line	for Asabu

== History ==
The subway station opened on 16 December 1971 coinciding with the opening of the Namboku Line from Makomanai Station to Kita-Nijuyo-Jo Station.

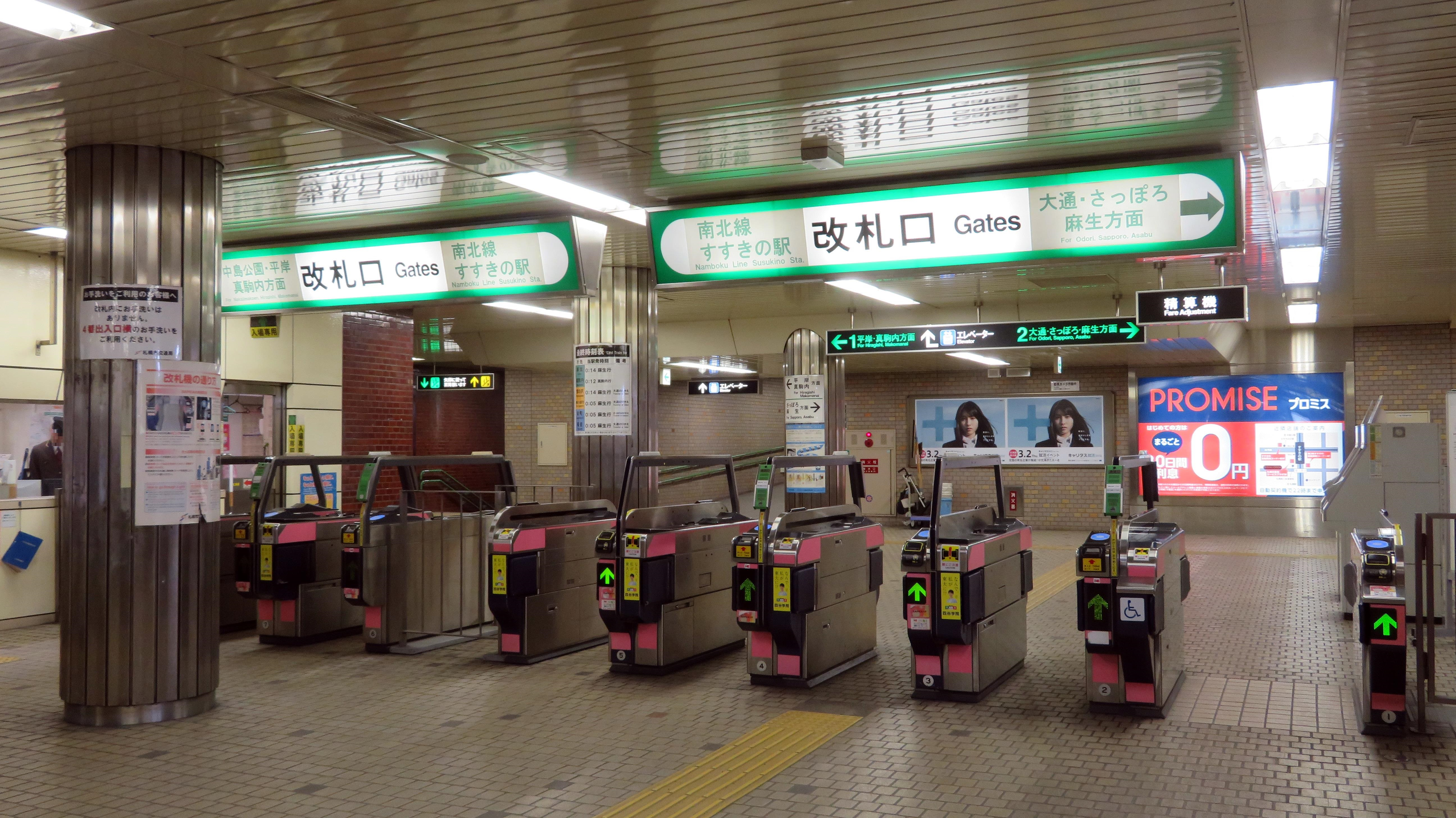
Ticket gates

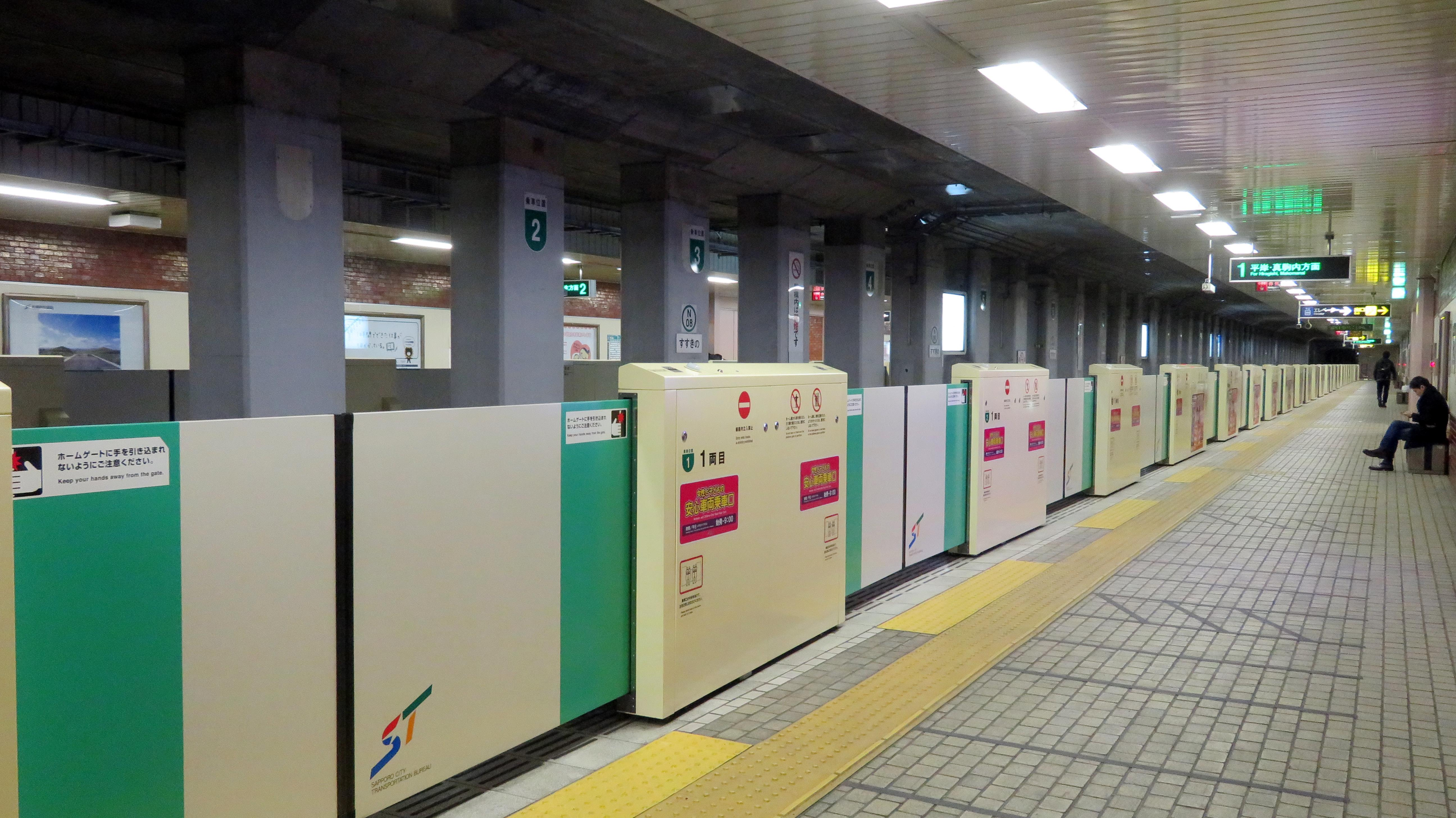
Station platform

== Surrounding area ==
On the south side of the station is located the largest red-light district north of Tokyo, Susukino, in which are concentrated many restaurants, bars, hotels, and adult-entertainment establishments.

- National Route 36 (to Muroran)
- Sapporo Central Police Station Susukino Police Box
- Minami Sanjo Post Office
- North Pacific Bank, Susukino branch
- Hokkaido Bank, Susukino branch
- Tomakomai Shinkin Bank, Sapporo branch
- Susukino Lafiler mega store
- Underground Shopping Malls (Pole Town & Aurora Town)
- Sapporo Tokyu Inn Hotel
- Sapporo Toho Plaza cinema
- Tanukikoji shopping arcade
- Sapporo Ramen Alley

== See also ==
- List of railway stations in Japan
