= Nishi-Jūitchōme Station =

Subway station in Sapporo, Japan

Coordinates: 43°3′30.738″N 141°20′25.416″E

T08 Nishi-Jūitchōme Station 西11丁目駅
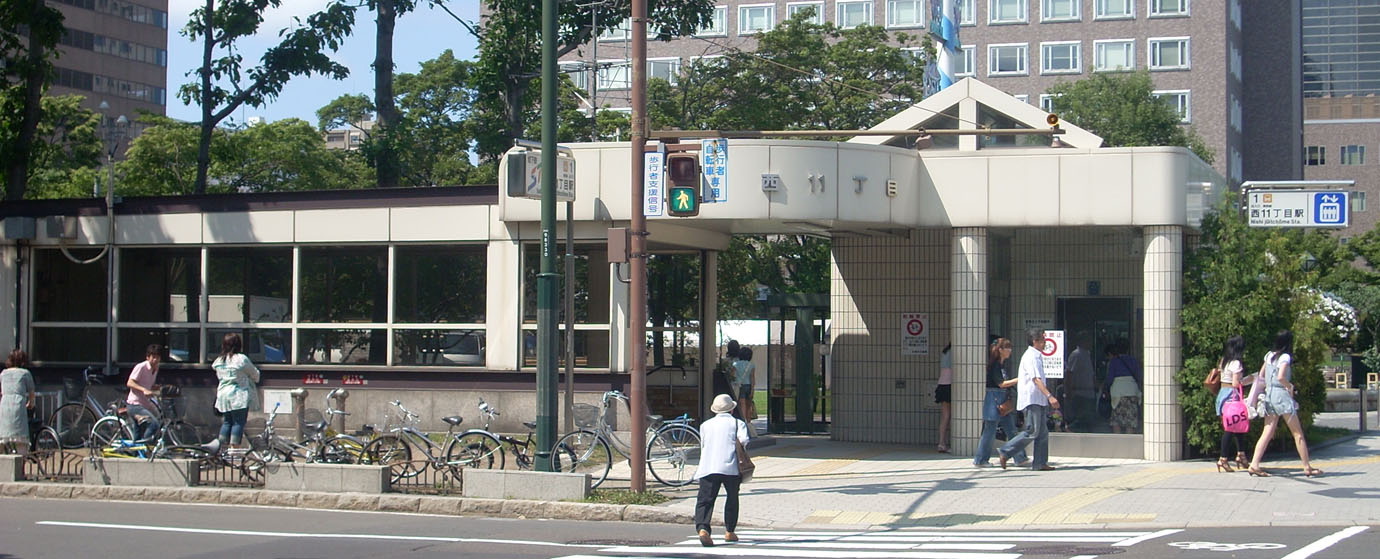
- Station entrance

General information
- Location: Chūō, Sapporo, Hokkaido; Japan
- System: Sapporo Municipal Subway station
- Operator: Sapporo City Transportation Bureau
- Line: Tōzai Line

Construction
- Accessible: Yes

Other information
- Station code: T08

History
- Opened: 10 June 1976; 50 years ago

Services
Preceding station	Sapporo Municipal Subway	Following station
Nishi-Jūhatchōme T07 towards Miyanosawa	Tōzai Line	Ōdōri T09 towards Shin-Sapporo
Location
- Location within Hokkaido Location within Japan

Nishi-Jūitchōme Station (西11丁目駅; lit. West 11th Street) is a Sapporo Municipal Subway station in Chūō-ku, Sapporo, Hokkaido, Japan. The station number is T08.

== Platforms ==
1	■ Tōzai Line	for Shin-Sapporo
2	■ Tōzai Line	for Miyanosawa

== History ==
The station opened on 10 June 1976 coinciding with the opening of the Tozai Line from Kotoni Station to Shiroishi Station.

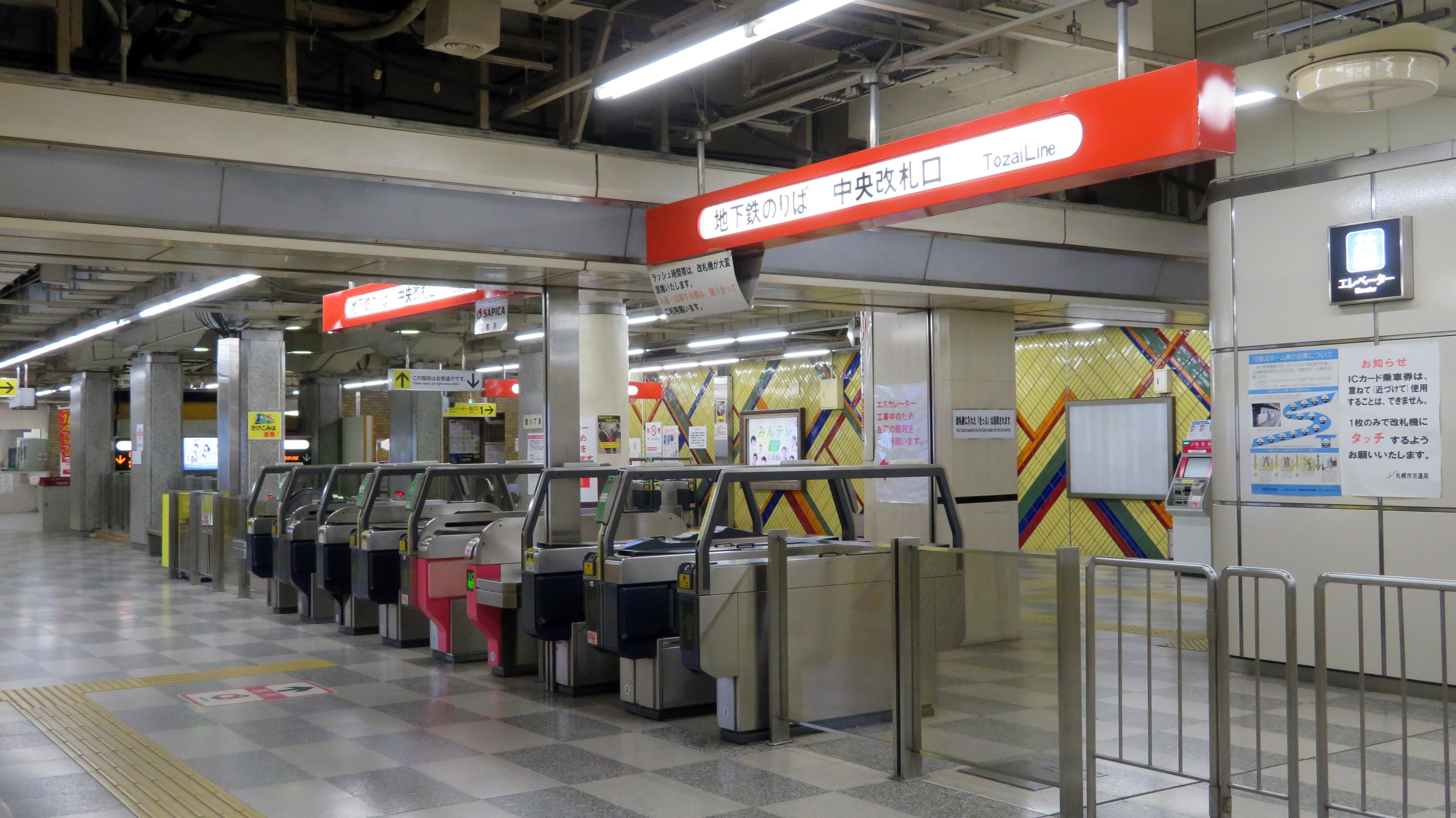
Ticket gates

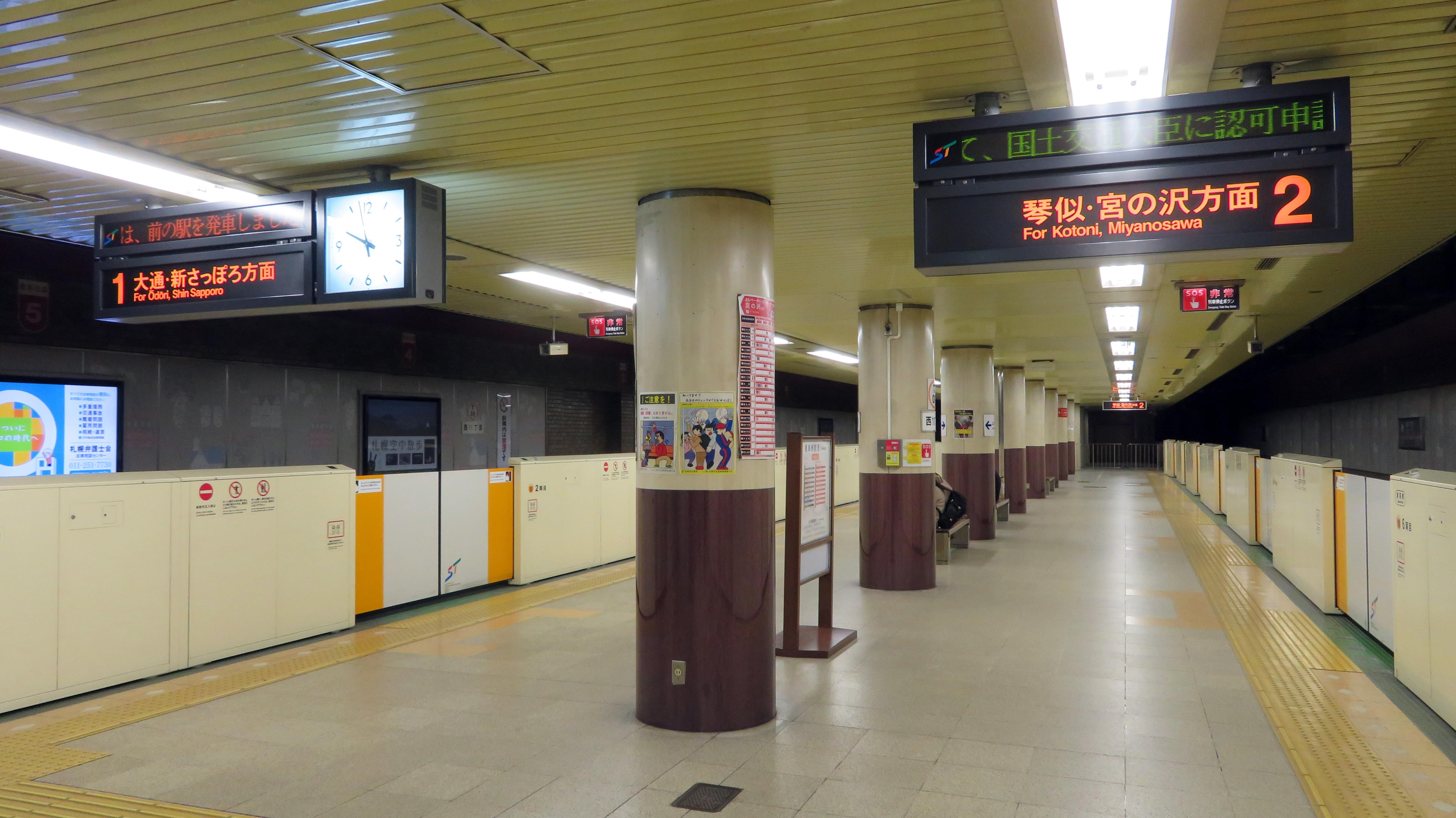
Station platform

== Surrounding area ==
- Chūō-Kuyakusho-Mae Station, Sapporo Streetcar
- Japan National Route 230, (to Setana)
- Miyoshi Shrine
- Ōdōri Park
- Sapporo Television Broadcasting
- Nitori Culture Hall
