= Sapporo Odori High School =

Municipal high school in Sapporo, Japan

Coordinates: 43.0624°N 141.3397°E

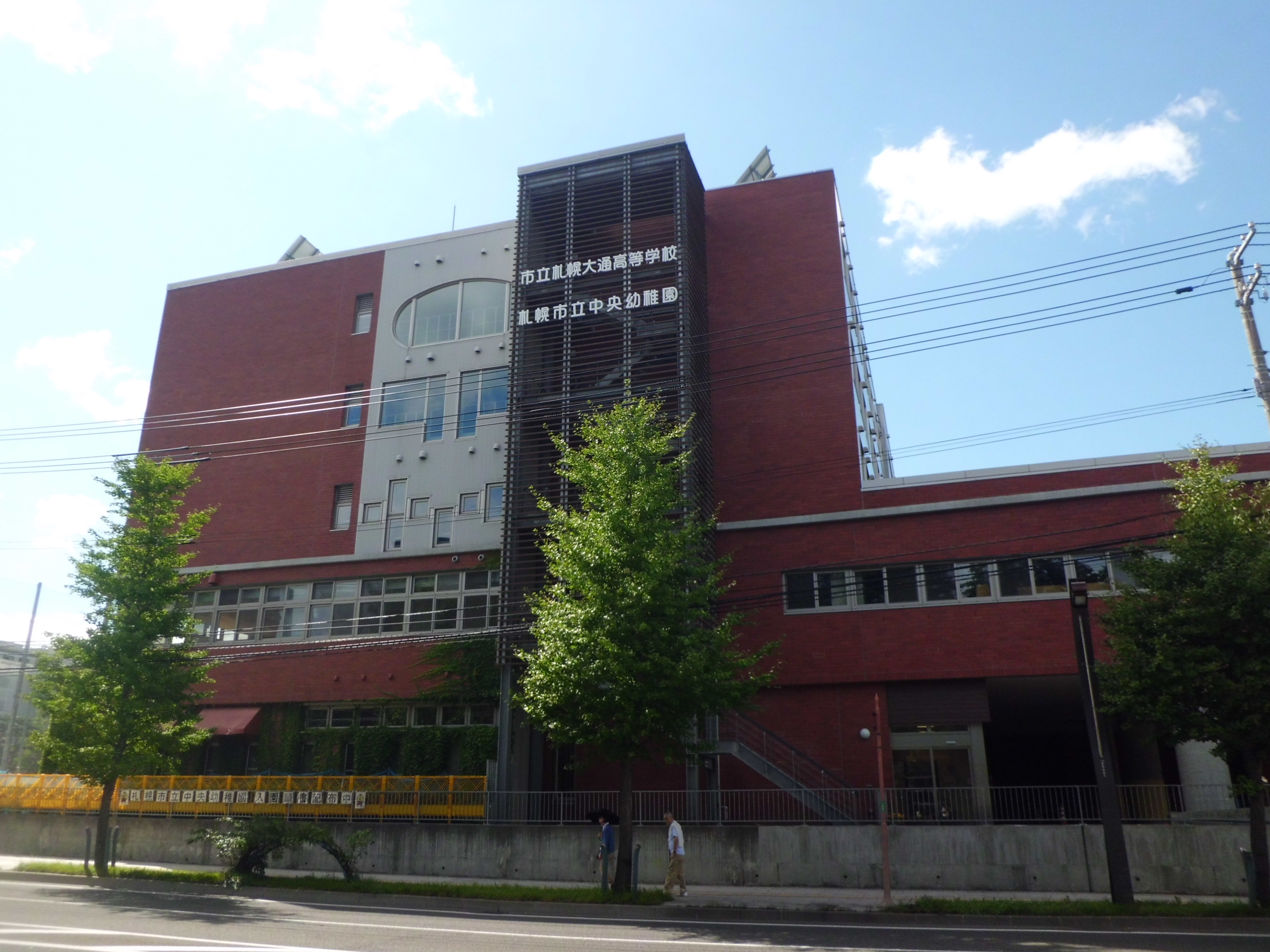
Sapporo Odori High School

Sapporo Odori High School (市立札幌大通高等学校, Shiritsu Sapporo Ōdori Kōtōgakkō) is a Japanese public high school in Chuo-ku, Sapporo, Hokkaido. Sapporo Odori High School provides Japanese-language classes to foreign and Japanese returnee students, and the school has special admissions quotas for these groups.
