= Hōheikan =

Historical building in Sapporo, Hokkaidō, Japan

Coordinates: 43°02′47″N 141°21′09″E

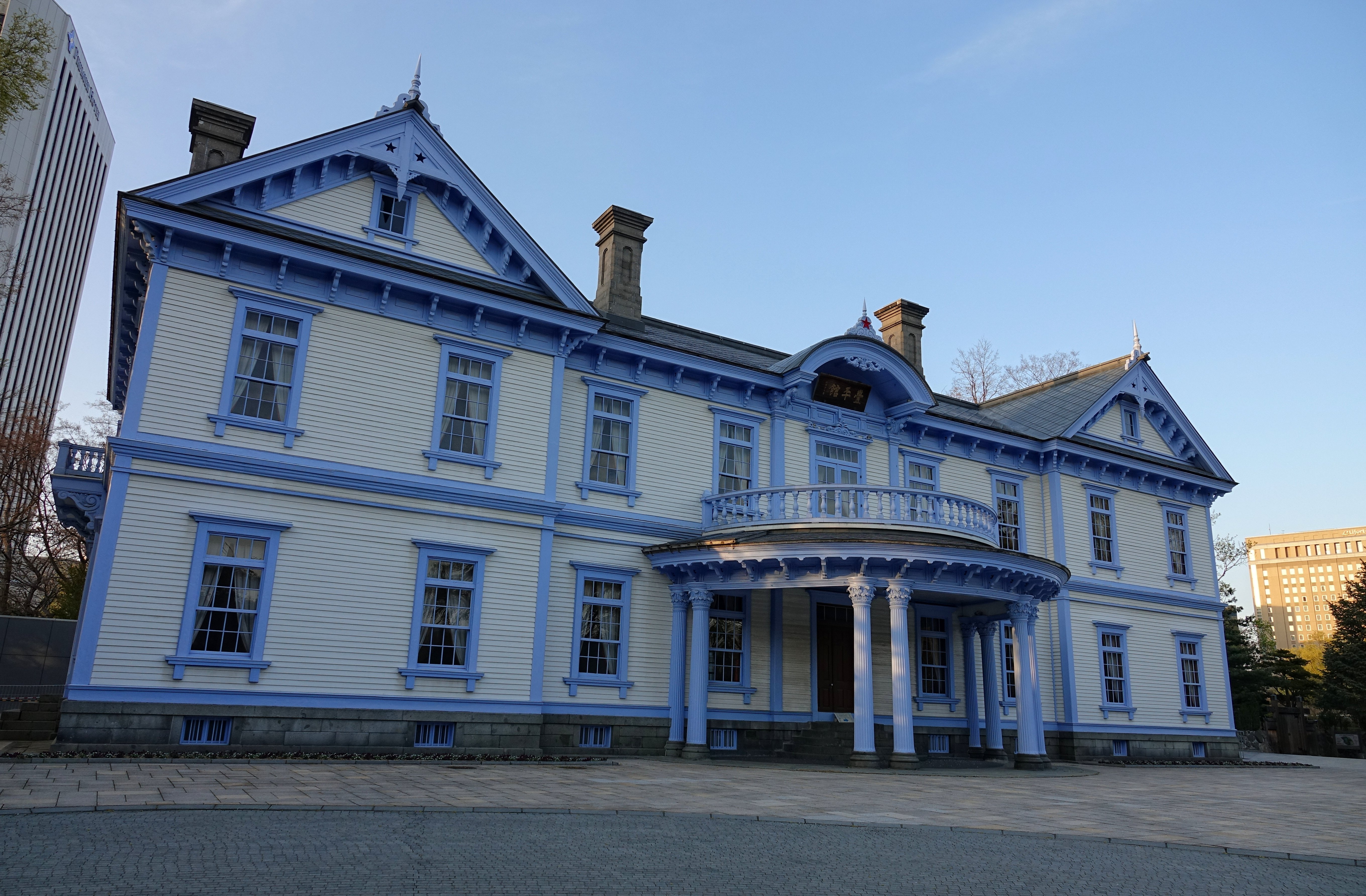
- Interactive map of the Hōheikan area

General information
- Location: Sapporo, Japan
- Construction started: 1879
- Completed: 1880
- Cost: 28,709.19 yen in Meiji Restoration
- Client: Hokkaidō Development Commission (Kaitaku shi)

Design and construction
- Architect: Ōoka Suke-emon
- Structural engineer: Kikou Adachi

The Hōheikan (豊平館, Hōheikan) is a historical building and a wedding venue, located in Nakajima Park, Chūō-ku, Sapporo, Hokkaidō, Japan. The building has previously been a hotel, guest house, event venue, and military camp. Currently, the Hōheikan is registered as one of the National Important Cultural Properties, and is used as a wedding venue, restaurant and meeting facility. The building is run by the Sapporo city.

== History ==
Administered by the Hokkaidō Development Commission (Kaitaku shi), the construction of the Hōheikan was started in 1879 in the Nishi 1-chōme area of Odori Park. It was completed in November 1880, and opened in December of the same year. The purpose of the construction was to construct an accommodation for the other countries' engineers developing the primitive Hokkaidō prefecture.

The building was officially opened as a hotel in August 1881, and invited the Emperor Meiji as the first guest. He stayed in the Hōheikan for four days. Winning fame as a hotel at which the Emperor had stayed, the Hōheikan was used for many ceremonies and as a hotel for officials. In 1882, the Hokkaidō Development Commission was demolished, and after the ownership of the Hōheikan was moved, the Imperial Household Ministry has lent the building to Sapporo. Followed by the Emperor Meiji, the Emperor Taishō stayed in the Hōheikan in 1911, so as the Emperor Hirohito in 1922.

As the city of Sapporo grew, the demand for the event venues increased. Sapporo city begged the Imperial Household Ministry for moving the ownership of the building to Sapporo, and in 1921, the Hōheikan was yielded to Sapporo city. In 1927, the building was enlarged by constructing new rooms on its back side, and the Hōheikan was used as the musical venue.

Along with the beginning of World War II, the Hōheikan functioned as the facility for the Japanese Northern District Army, and after Japan lost the war, it was confiscated by the American army and used as their accommodation. After the American army moved to the Camp Crowford, which was a camp constructed in current Minami-ku, Sapporo, the Hōheikan was returned to Sapporo, and used as the community centre.

The Hōheikan was pulled down in order to move to Nakajima Park, and in 1958, the new building was completed at the current place, and opened as the wedding hall and restaurant. In 1964, the Hōheikan was registered as one of the Important Cultural Properties. The building has been repaired and renovated between 1983 and 1986. The Crown Prince Naruhito visited the Hōheikan in 1986.

== Overview ==
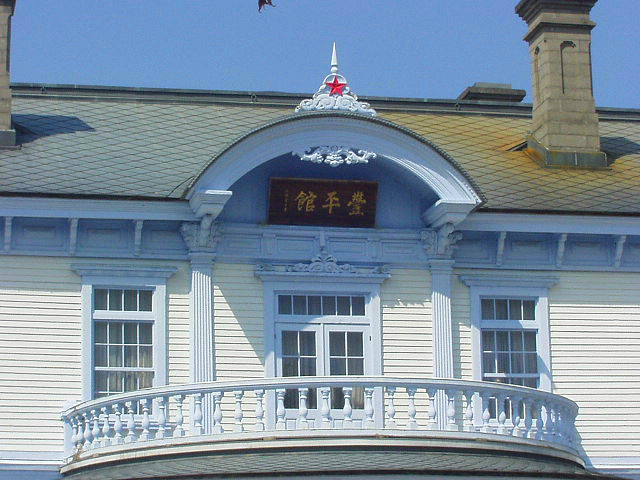
The balcony and the roof of the Hōheikan

The Hōheikan is currently the only building used as a wedding hall among the Important Cultural Properties. The building is also the oldest wooden hotel building in existence in Japan. The architecture of the Hōheikan comprises a few styles. The whole building was constructed in the American style, but the balcony and its accompaniments at the front of the building was constructed in European style. The semicircle roof at the centre of the building has a Gegyo (懸魚) sculpture, a Japanese traditional fish sculpture usually seen at the roof of Japanese shrines and temples. The colour Ultramarine blue, which was imported from Europe, is painted on the column and window frames.

Used as a wedding venue, the Hōheikan has held wedding ceremonies for over 20,000 couples, as of January 2004. The Hōheikan has also been a party venue. The restaurant and cafe are also housed in the building, and guests also enjoy snacks. The restaurant serves Japanese and French cuisine, and uses ingredients harvested in Hokkaidō prefecture.

The first floor of the building covers 522.94 m^{2}. The Hōheikan is located northwestward of the Nakajima Park, and is close to the other buildings in the park including the Sapporo Concert Hall Kitara. The nearest subway station is the Nakajima Kōen station, Namboku Line.
