= Former Hokkaidō Government Office =

Japanese historical building and museum

Coordinates: 43°03′50″N 141°20′53″E

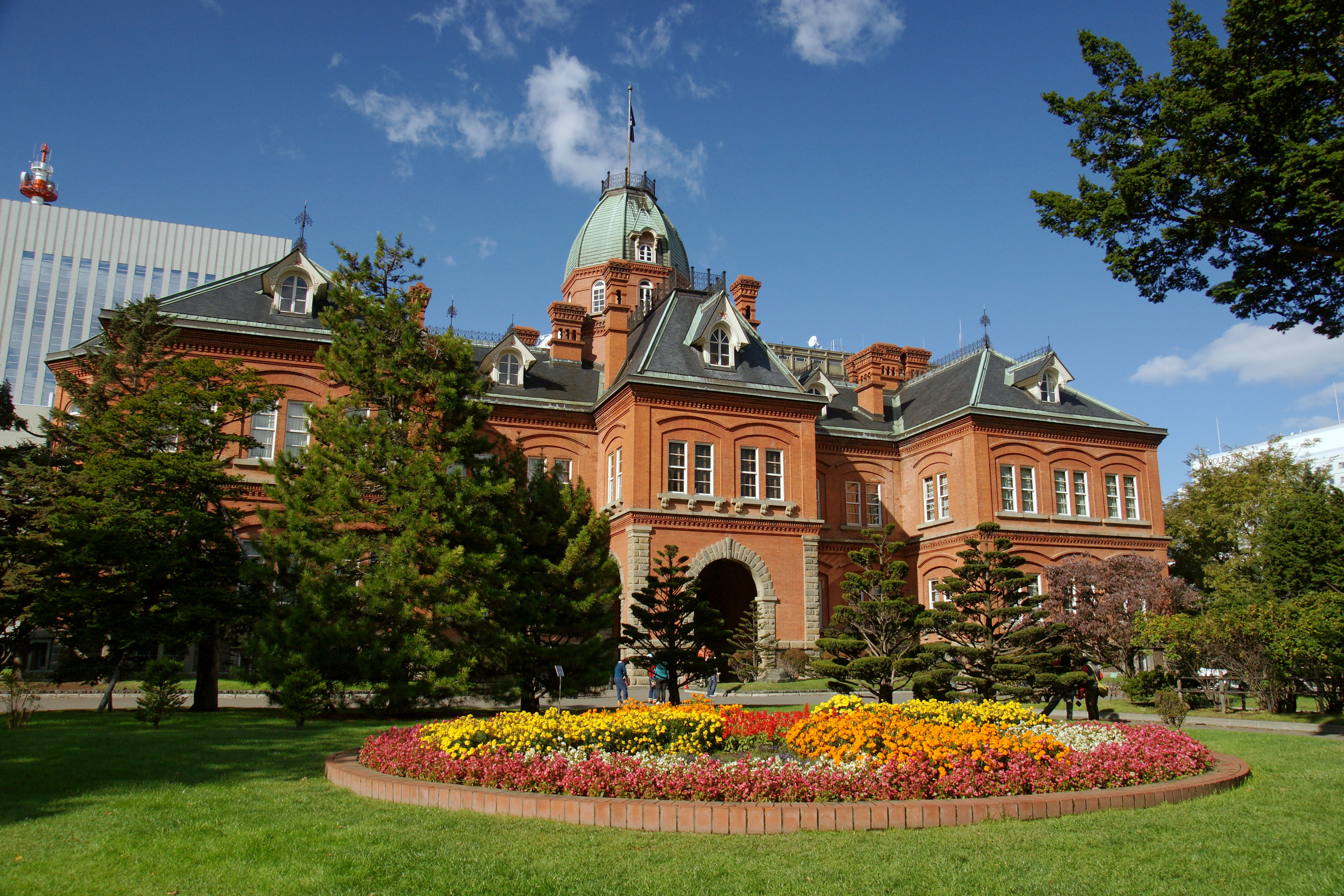
Former Hokkaidō Government Office during summer

The facilities of the former Hokkaidō Government Office (Japanese: 北海道庁旧本庁舎) in Sapporo, Japan, include a conference room, a museum shop, a tourist information office, and a few historical exhibition rooms and libraries. Visitors can enter the building for free. Flower gardens and a pond are located in front of the building, which occasionally are designated as some event venues.

== History ==
Inside and outside the Former Hokkaidō Government Office, 2016

In 1869, the Kaitakushi, the development commission and government of Hokkaidō prefecture, was established to pioneer the primitive ground of Hokkaidō, and its main office was moved to Sapporo in 1871. An American advisor to the Development Commission, Horace Capron, planned to construct the building for the Kaitakushi office with an octagonal dome topping on the building, which was popular architectural style in the United States at that time. The building, named as the Hokkaidō Development Commission Sapporo Main Office (開拓使札幌本庁舎, Kaitakushi Sapporo Honchōsha), was built in 1873, and was then one of the largest buildings in Japan. It was destroyed by fire in 1879.

After the abolition of the Kaitakushi in 1882, Hokkaidō was divided into a number of prefectures, and later the Hokkaidō Government was established in 1886. The destroyed building was restored, and the new government office building was inaugurated in 1888, with red bricks and the octagonal dome on top of the building as the first governor, Michitoshi Iwamura, had suggested.

In 1896, air vents and the octagonal dome on the top were taken away. Fire destroyed the building again in 1909, and the inside was burnt down, while the walls of the building with red bricks sustained little damage. In 1910, restoration work of the building began, and was completed in 1911.

The Government of Hokkaidō Prefecture commemorated its 100th anniversary in 1968, and original air vents and the octagonal dome were restored and installed to the building again to commemorate the anniversary, and government determined to continue preserving the building permanently. The following year, the building was listed as one of the National Important Cultural Properties. In 1985, the Archives of Hokkaidō was housed in the building. The Karafuto/Sakhalin Related Resource Library, which had been located in the Hokkaidō government office annex in West 18 since 1992, was also placed in the building in 2004.

== Overview ==
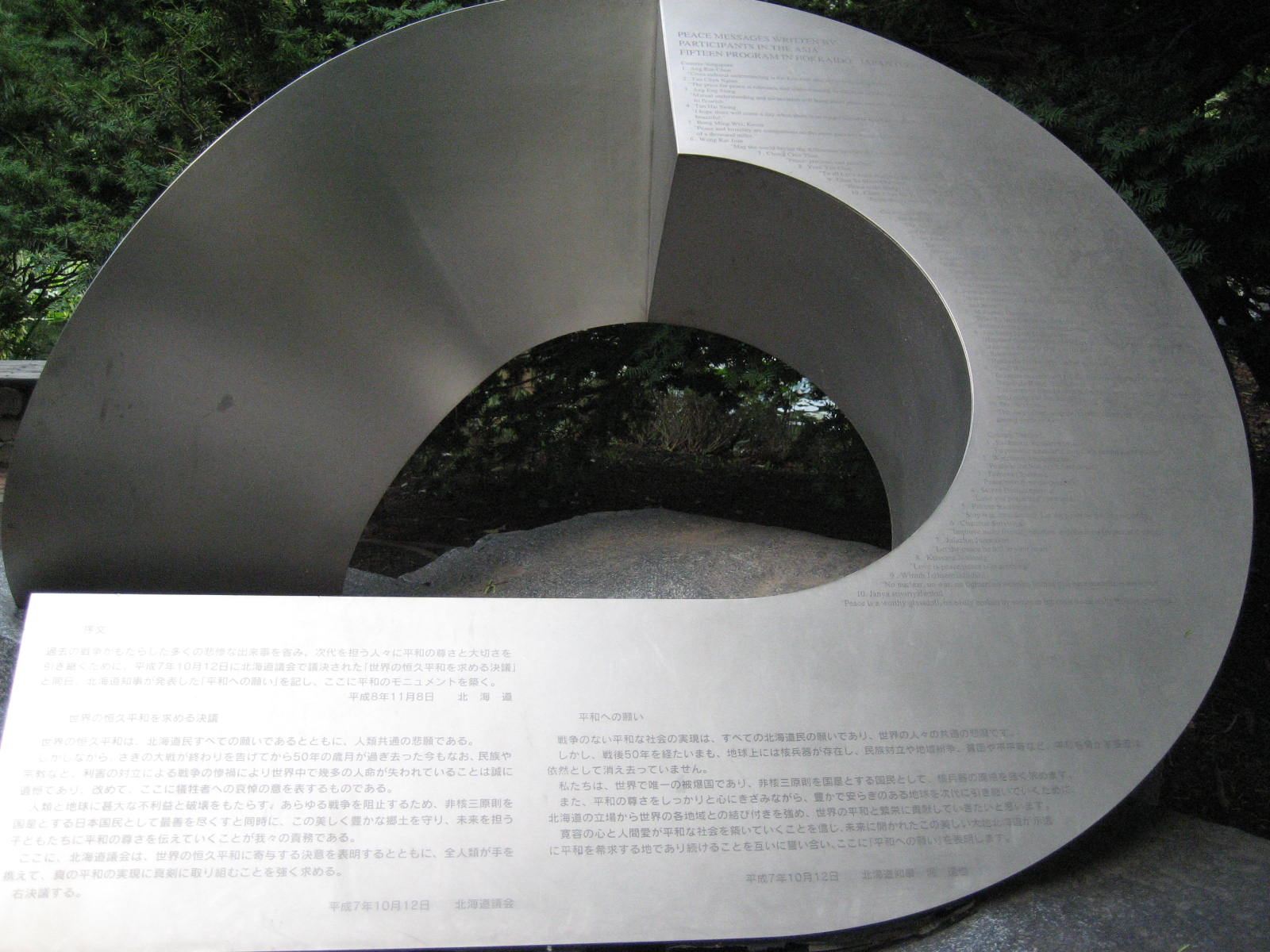
Asian Peace Messages of 1996 Hokkaidō Program in front of the building: "Peace is the bridge between countries"

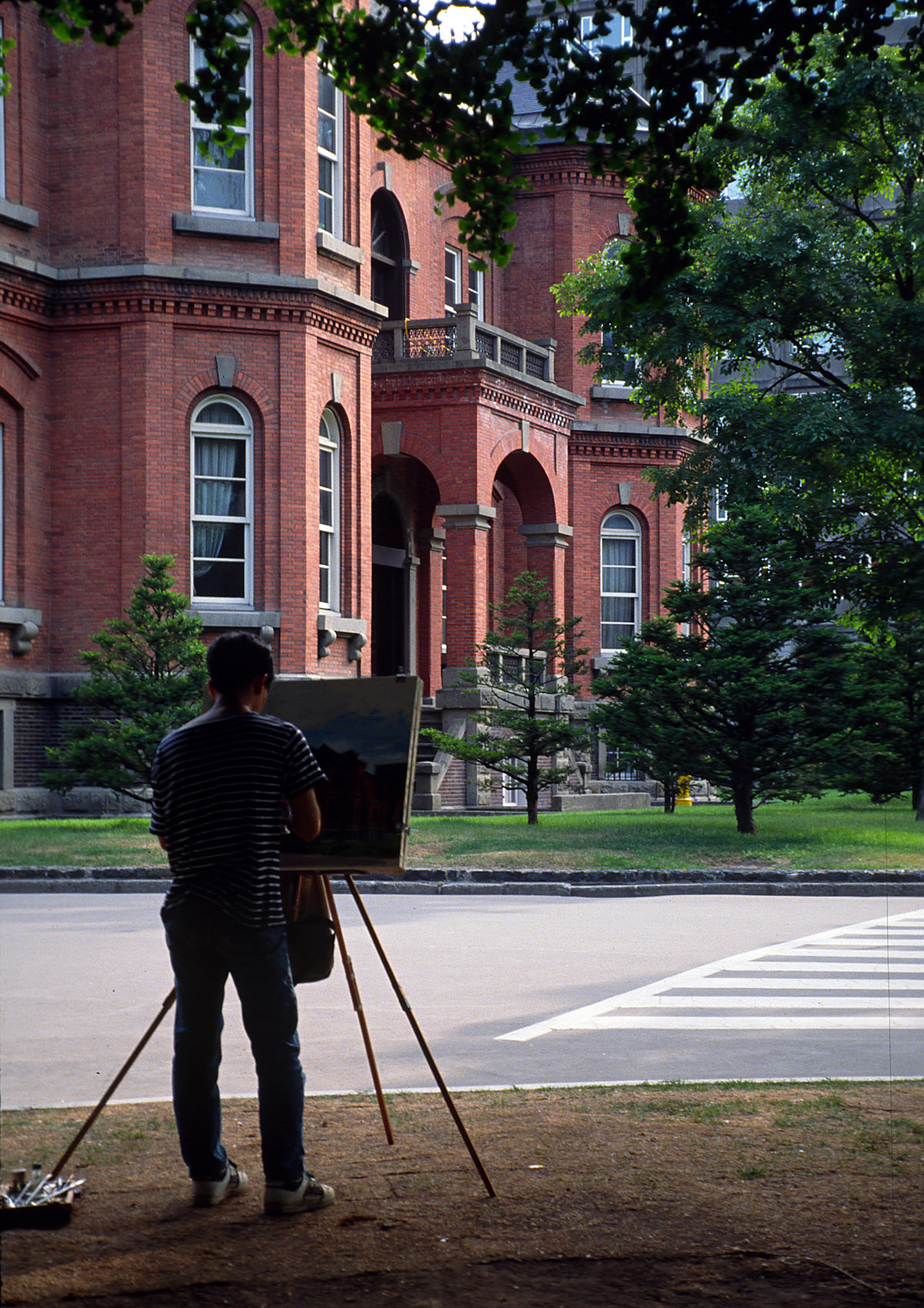
The brick facade attracts tourists and artists.

The measurement of the building is 61 metres in frontage, 36 metres in depth, and 33 metres in height to the top of the tower. The red bricks used in the wall of the building were made in Toyohira and Shiroishi villages, which are currently wards of Sapporo (as Toyohira-ku and Shiroishi-ku), and the number of the bricks in the walls is around 2.5 million. There are 20 paintings inside of the building, which depict historically important scenes in the history of Hokkaidō. Most of the windows are double-paned, to keep out the freezing climate of Sapporo.

It houses several facilities. The Archives of Hokkaidō contains a number of historical materials related to Hokkaidō, and the annex building of the archives is currently located in West 5, which is close to the former office building and previously functioned as the Library of Hokkaidō (the library was moved and is currently located in Ebetsu). The Gallery of Hokkaidō's History was designed to display panels and historical instruments used in farms and cultivation, and is a branch exhibition room of the Historical Museum of Hokkaidō. The Karafuto/Sakhalin Related Resource Library showcases materials related to Karafuto, which used to be the northernmost area of Japan and has been part of Russia as Sakhalin Oblast since the end of World War II.

The tourism information center was placed on the second floor, which provides some brochures written in several languages. The three-section arch, which is decorated with engravings in Western architecture, is installed in the entrance hall. The Governor's former office room is open to the public, and it displays restored room facilities as well as pictures of the successive governors in Hokkaidō. Other rooms are occasionally designated as conference rooms, and many companies and organizations have used these rooms for their meetings.
