= Sapporo Streetcar =

Tram/streetcar line in Hokkaido, Japan

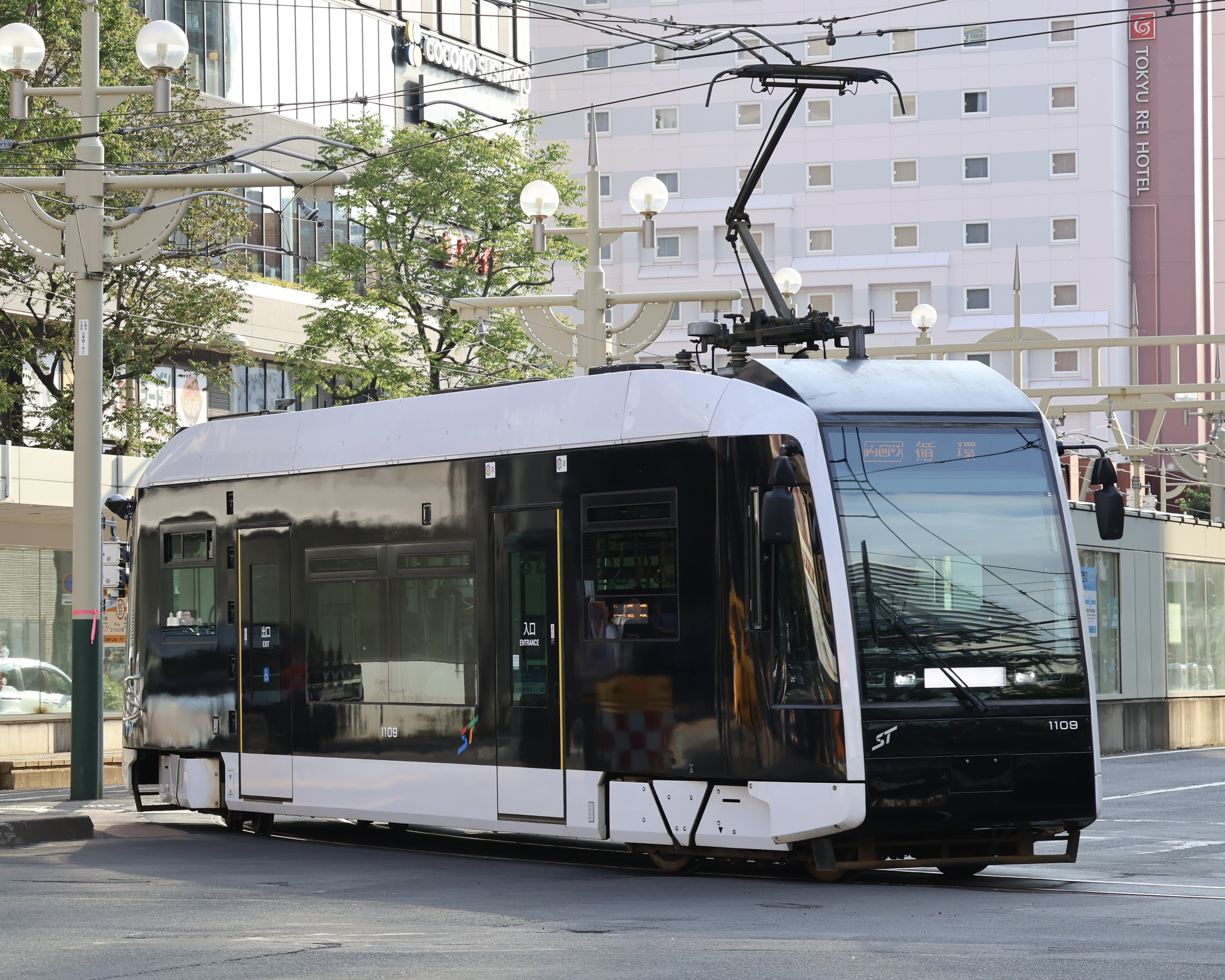

Overview
- Native name: Sapporo Shiden (札幌市電)
- Owner: Sapporo City Transportation Bureau
- Locale: Sapporo
- Transit type: Tram
- Number of lines: 4
- Number of stations: 24
- Website: city.sapporo.jp

Operation
- Began operation: 1909; 117 years ago 1918 (electrification)
- Reporting marks: ST

Technical
- System length: 8,905 m (5.533 mi)
- No. of tracks: 2
- Track gauge: 1,067 mm (3 ft 6 in)
- Electrification: 600 V DC from overhead catenary
System map
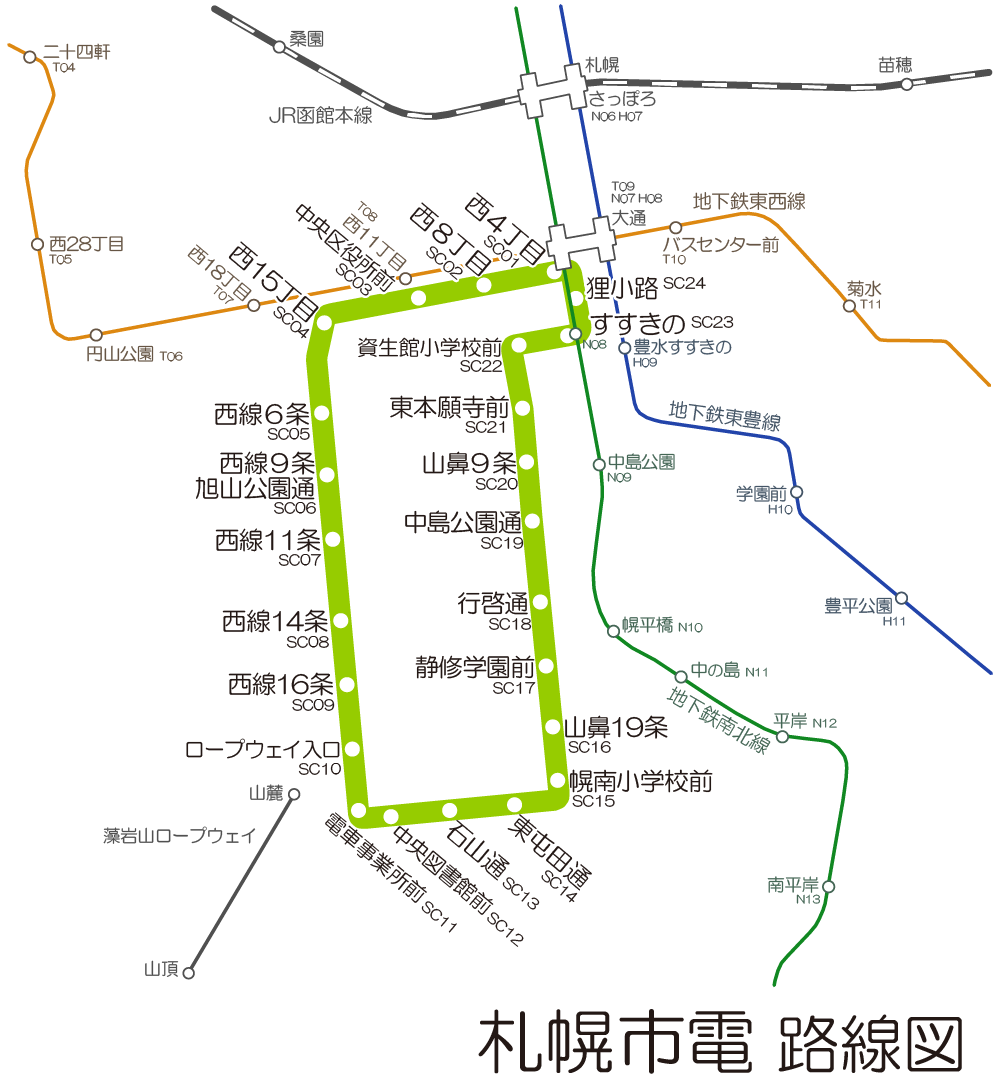

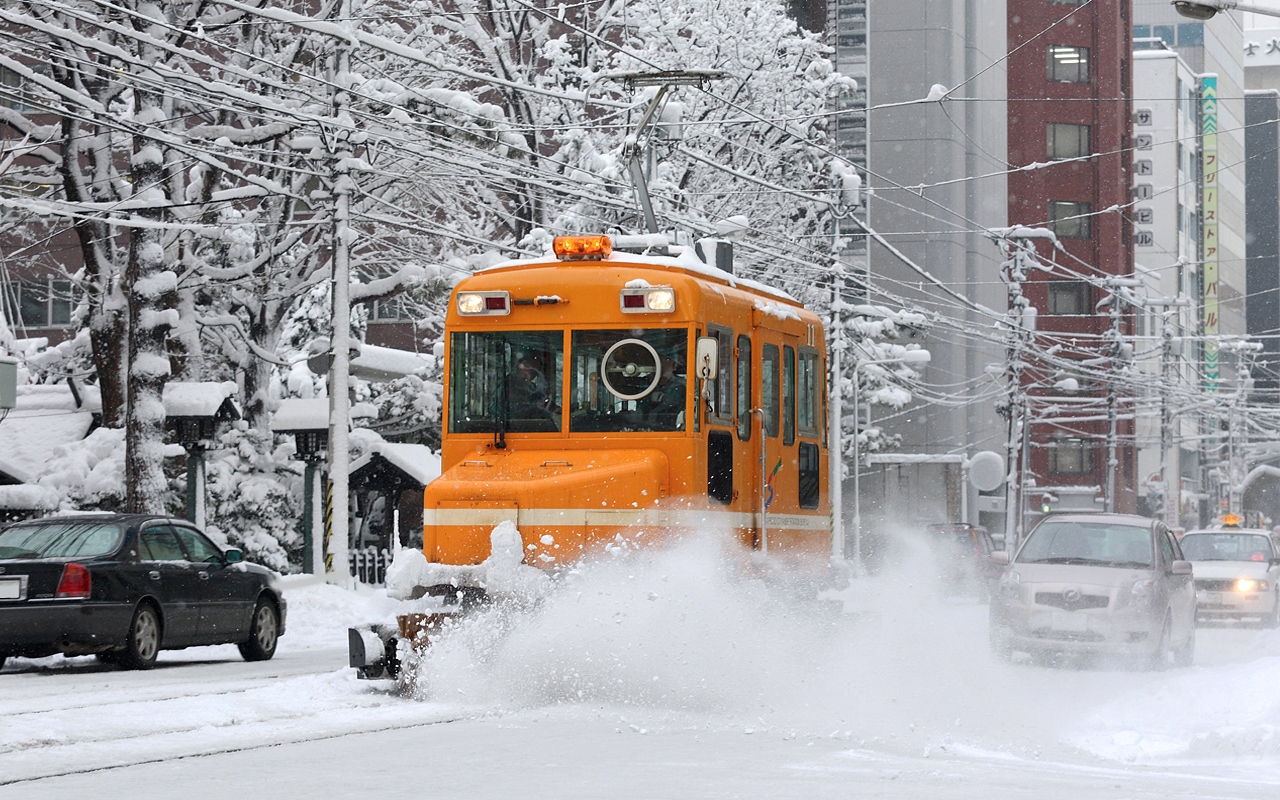
The unique "Sasara Tram" snow clearer which uses rotating bamboo brushes to clear tracks in winter, January 2009

The Sapporo Streetcar (札幌市電, Sapporo shiden) is a tram loop located in Sapporo, Hokkaidō, Japan. It is operated by the Sapporo City Transportation Bureau. The system is often referred to as simply "shiden" (市電).

The first section of the network opened in 1909 as the "Sapporo Stone Horsecar Railway" (札幌石材馬車鉄道, Sapporo sekizai basha tetsudō); it was electrified in 1918. The city transportation bureau took over the network in 1927. Since 2020, it has been managed by a subsidiary company, Sapporo Transportation Service Promotion Corporation (札幌市交通事業振興公社, Sapporo-shi kōtsū jigyō shinkō kōsha).

== Lines and routes ==
At its peak in 1958, the network was 25 kilometers (16 mi) in length with 11 lines and 7 routes. However, the network shrank due to increased automobile ownership and the opening of the Sapporo Municipal Subway.

After the closures in the 1970s, three lines remained. They were collectively called the Ichijō-Yamahana Streetcar Line (一条・山鼻軌道線, Ichijō-yamahana-kidōsen) or simply the Streetcar Line (軌道線, Kidōsen), since the lines covered an incomplete city center route.

- Ichijō Line (一条線): Nishi-Yon-Chōme – Nishi-Jūgo-Chōme
- Yamahana-Nishi Line (山鼻西線): Nishi-Jūgo-Chōme – Chūō-Toshokan-Mae
- Yamahana Line (山鼻線): Chūō-Toshokan-Mae – Susukino

The lines were combined into a single circle route following the opening of the Toshin Line (都心線) between Susukino and Nishi-Yon-Chōme in December 2015.

Almost all trams run the full circle line, with several trams running between Nishi-Yon-Chōme and Nishisen-Jūroku-Jō during the morning rush hours. Trams run at a frequency of 7 to 8 minutes during the day and 3 minutes during weekday peak periods between Nishi-Yon-Chōme and Nishisen-Jūroku-Jō stations. Vehicles are taken out of service at Chūō-Toshokan-Mae.

Sapporo Streetcars, 2016

The fare is ¥230. Like the subway, the tram accepts the SAPICA card, a prepaid magnetic card. Any other electronic IC cards (like Kitaca or Suica) can also be used.

== Stations ==
- All stations are located in Chūō-ku, Sapporo.

Official Line Name	No.	Station	Japanese	Distance (km)		Transfers	Location
Official Line Name	No.	Station	Japanese	Line	Total	Transfers	Location
Ichijō Line	SC01	Nishi-Yon-Chōme	西4丁目	0	0	Subway Namboku Line (Ōdōri, N07 ) Subway Tōhō Line (Ōdōri, H08 ) Subway Tōzai Line (Ōdōri, T09 )	Minami 1-jō, Nishi 4-chōme
Ichijō Line	SC02	Nishi-Hatchōme	西8丁目	0.501	0.501		Minami 1-jō, Nishi 8-chōme
Ichijō Line	SC03	Chūō-Kuyakusho-Mae	中央区役所前	0.901	0.901	Subway Tōzai Line (Nishi-Jūitchōme, T08 )	Minami 1-jō, Nishi 10-chōme
Ichijō Line	SC04	Nishi-Jūgo-Chōme	西15丁目	1.436	1.436	Subway Tōzai Line (Nishi-Jūhatchōme, T07 )	Minami 1-jō, Nishi 14-chōme
Yamahana-Nishi Line	SC05	Nishisen-Roku-Jō	西線6条	0.564	2.000		Minami 6-jō, Nishi 14-chōme
Yamahana-Nishi Line	SC06	Nishisen-Ku-Jō Asahiyama-Kōen-Dōri	西線9条旭山公園通	0.938	2.374		Minami 9-jō, Nishi 14-chōme
Yamahana-Nishi Line	SC07	Nishisen-Jūichi-Jō	西線11条	1.308	2.744		Minami 11-jō, Nishi 14-chōme
Yamahana-Nishi Line	SC08	Nishisen-Jūyo-Jō	西線14条	1.790	3.226		Minami 14-jō, Nishi 14-chōme
Yamahana-Nishi Line	SC09	Nishisen-Jūroku-Jō	西線16条	2.164	3.600		Minami 16-jō, Nishi 14-chōme
Yamahana-Nishi Line	SC10	Ropeway-Iriguchi	ロープウェイ入口	2.537	3.973		Minami 19-jō, Nishi 14-chōme
Yamahana-Nishi Line	SC11	Densha-Jigyōsho-Mae	電車事業所前	2.873	4.309		Minami 21-jō, Nishi 14-chōme
Yamahana-Nishi Line	SC12	Chūō-Toshokan-Mae	中央図書館前	3.154	4.590		Minami 22-jō, Nishi 13-chōme
Yamahana Line	SC13	Ishiyama-Dōri	石山通	0.331	4.921		Minami 22-jō, Nishi 11-chōme
Yamahana Line	SC14	Higashi-Tonden-Dōri	東屯田通	0.611	5.202		Minami 22-jō, Nishi 9-chōme
Yamahana Line	SC15	Kōnan-Shōgakkō-Mae	幌南小学校前	1.023	5.613		Minami 22-jō, Nishi 7-chōme
Yamahana Line	SC16	Yamahana-Jūku-Jō	山鼻19条	1.281	5.871		Minami 19-jō, Nishi 7-chōme
Yamahana Line	SC17	Seishūgakuen-Mae	静修学園前	1.697	6.287	Subway Namboku Line (Horohira-Bashi, N10 )	Minami 16-jō, Nishi 7-chōme
Yamahana Line	SC18	Gyōkei-Dōri	行啓通	2.028	6.618		Minami 14-jō, Nishi 7-chōme
Yamahana Line	SC19	Nakajima-Kōen-Dōri	中島公園通	2.505	7.095		Minami 11-jō, Nishi 7-chōme
Yamahana Line	SC20	Yamahana-Ku-Jō	山鼻9条	2.848	7.438	Subway Namboku Line (Nakajima-Kōen, N09 )	Minami 9-jō, Nishi 7-chōme
Yamahana Line	SC21	Higashi-Honganji-Mae	東本願寺前	3.161	7.751		Minami 7-jō, Nishi 7-chōme
Yamahana Line	SC22	Shiseikan-Shōgakkō-Mae	資生館小学校前	3.592	8.182		Minami 4-jō, Nishi 6-chōme
Yamahana Line	SC23	Susukino	すすきの	3.866	8.456	Subway Namboku Line (Susukino, N08 ) Subway Tōhō Line (Hōsui-Susukino, H09 )	Minami 4-jō, Nishi 4-chōme
Toshin Line	SC24	Tanuki Kōji	狸小路	0.247	8.703		Minami 3-jō, Nishi 4-chōme (anti-clockwise); Minami 2-jō, Nishi 3-chōme (clockwise)
Toshin Line	SC01	Nishi Yon-Chome	西4丁目	0.449	8.905	Loop: see above	

== Rolling stock ==
Series	Constructed	Builder	Fleet Numbers	Articulated
210	1958	Fujiya Tekkō, Taiwa Sharyō, Unyu Kōgyō	211-216	No
220	1959	Fujiya Tekkō, Naebo Kōgyō, Taiwa Sharyō, Unyu Kōgyō	221-228	No
240	1960	Fujiya Tekkō, Naebo Kōgyō, Taiwa Sharyō	241-248	No
250	1961	Naebo Kōgyō, Taiwa Sharyō	251-255	No
8500	1985	Kawasaki Heavy Industries	8501-8502	No
8510	1987	Kawasaki Heavy Industries	8511-8512	No
8520	1988	Kawasaki Heavy Industries	8521-8522	No
3300	1998–2001	Alna Kōki	3301-3305	No
A1200	2013–2014	Alna Sharyo	A1201-A1203	Yes
1100	2018–2023	Alna Sharyo	1101-1110	No
A1210	2024–	Alna Sharyo	A1211-A1215	Yes

== See also ==
- Sapporo Municipal Subway
- Sapporo City Transportation Bureau
- List of tram and light rail transit systems
