= Chūō-ku, Sapporo =

Coordinates: 43°3′19″N 141°20′28″E

Chūō 中央区
- Ward
- Chūō Ward
- Flag Seal

- Location of Chūō-ku in Sapporo
- Country: Japan
- Prefecture: Hokkaido
- City: Sapporo
- Established: April 1, 1972

Area
  - Total: 46.42 km^{2} (17.92 sq mi)

Population (2021)
  - Total: 241,347
  - Density: 5,199/km^{2} (13,470/sq mi)
- Estimation as of August 31, 2021
- Website: www.city.sapporo.jp/chuo

Chūō-ku (中央区, Chūō-ku) is one of the ten wards in Sapporo, Hokkaido, Japan. Chūō-ku means "central ward" in Japanese. City administration and entertainment facilities are centred in this ward.

== History ==
During Meiji Period, Sousei river, precursor of Susukino district, Sapporo Beer company and the drill hall of the former Sapporo Agricultural College were built in the area where Chūō-ku is currently located. After Sapporo was divided into wards (ku, 区), Sapporo Agricultural College, currently Hokkaido University, was moved to what would become Kita-ku, and was replaced by the Sapporo wards administration building.

In 1922, Sapporo was chartered as a city. The 1st Sapporo Snow Festival was held during the Showa period, and Sapporo City Hall was erected in 1971.

Chūō-ku was officially established in 1972, when the Sapporo Olympics was held and Sapporo was accredited as one of the city designated by government ordinance. During the Olympics, Chūō-ku hosted the normal hill ski jumping event and the ski jumping portion of the Nordic combined event. The other 6 wards (Higashi-ku, Kita-ku, Minami-ku, Nishi-ku, Shiroishi-ku and Toyohira-ku) were also established in the same year. The ski jump would be a venue when the FIS Nordic World Ski Championships would be held at Sapporo in 2007.

== Overview ==
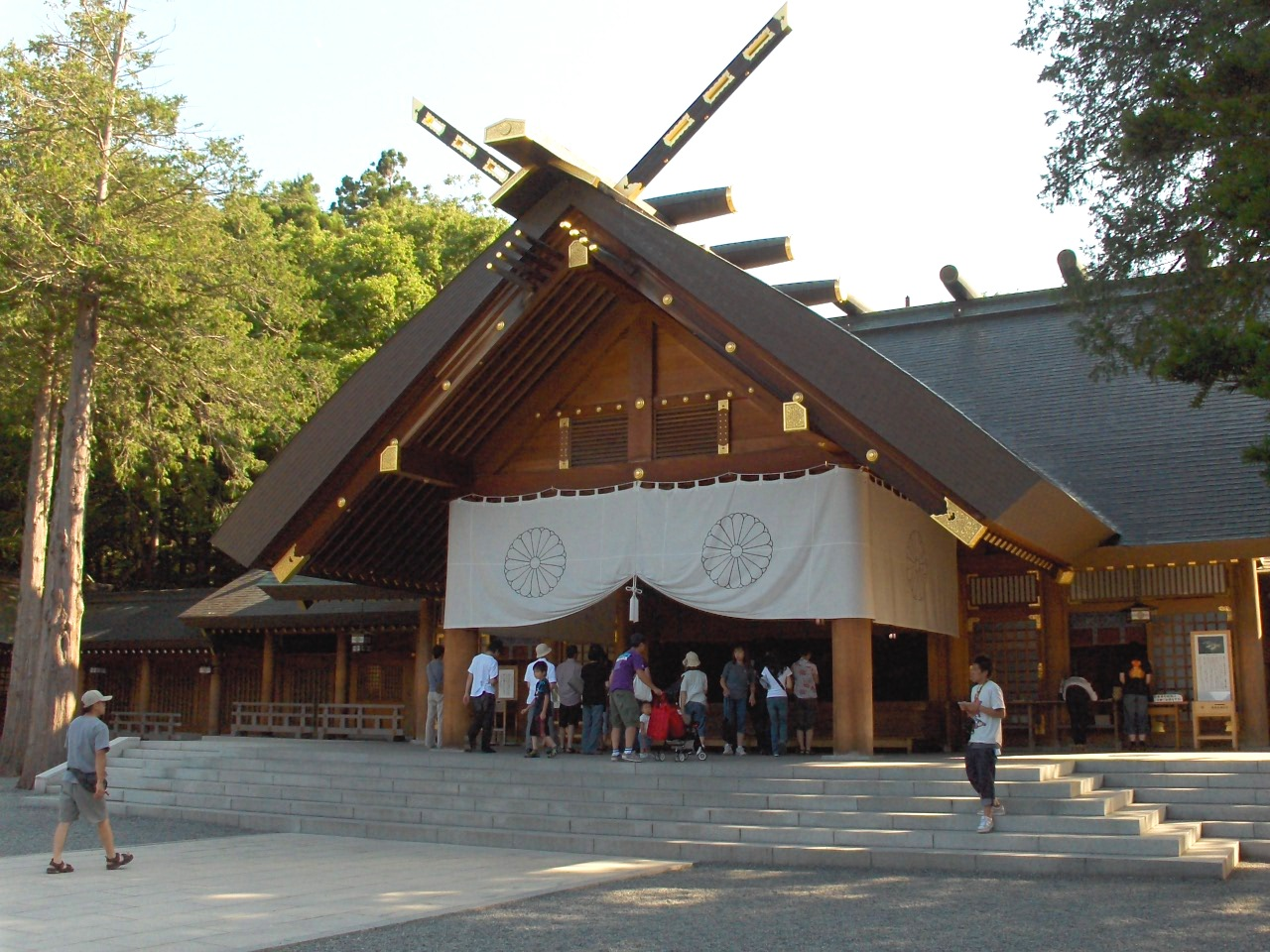
Hokkaidō Shrine

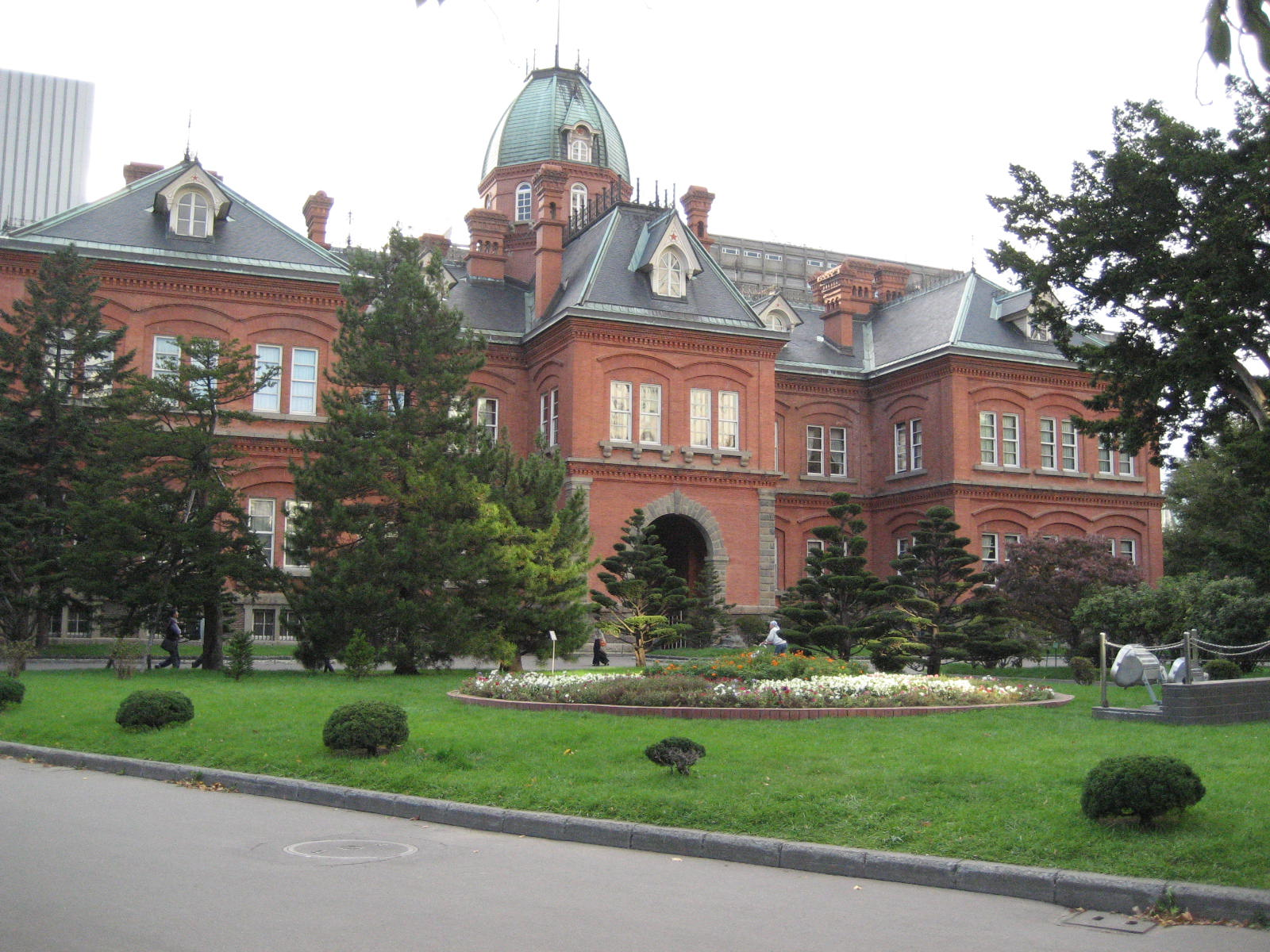
Former Hokkaido Government Office in Chuo-ku

The ward is located in the center of Sapporo. As a downtown district of the city, there are a lot of governmental offices and buildings of companies. The City Hall of Sapporo, the office building of the government of Hokkaido and the headquarters of Hokkaidō Police office are located.

Chūō-ku is also the centre for sightseeing, and many of historical and entertainment facilities of Sapporo are located. Odori Park lies on the centre of the ward, and Sapporo TV Tower is placed on the eastern end of the park. The Sapporo Snow Festival is also held annually in Odori Park. The largest shinto shrine in Hokkaidō prefecture, Hokkaido Shrine (Hokkaidō jingu) is located in Miyanomori area, and draws a number of people on the island during Oshougatsu (the New Year's Day). Maruyama Zoo, Mt. Okura Ski Jump Stadium, and Miyanomori middle hill jump stadium are near the shrine.

Susukino area has many bars and pubs. The street car runs from there to Odori Park going around the ward. A panorama view is enjoyable on the top of Mt. Moiwa, which has a ropeway. Memorial guest hall, Hōhei Kan, is in Nakajima Park, which houses a music hall Sapporo Concert Hall "Kitara". The Hokkaido University Botanical Gardens is also in this ward.

== Economy ==
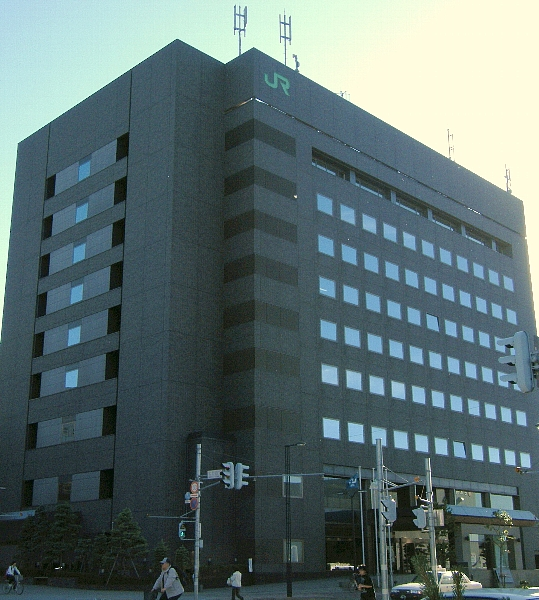
Headquarters of the Hokkaido Railway Company

Hokkaido Railway Company has its headquarters in the ward. Hokkaido International Airlines (Air Do) is headquartered in Chūō-ku. Yomiuri Shimbun has a branch office in the ward.

Japan Airlines, at one time, operated a ticketing facility on the second floor of the Imon Sapporo Building in Chūō-ku. On March 31, 2009, the facility closed.

== Statistics ==
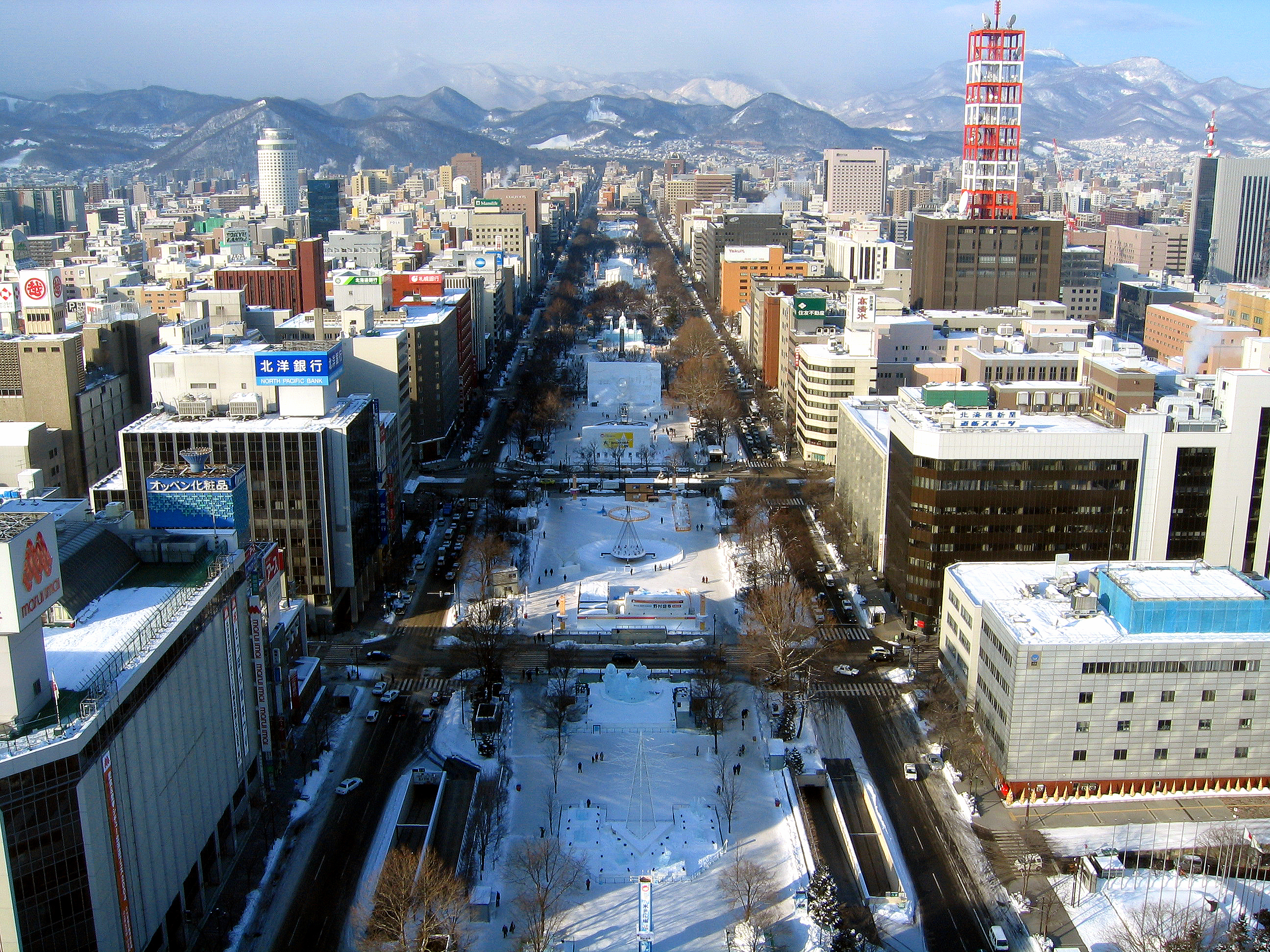
Odori Park

As of April 1, 2008, statistics of Chūō-ku, Sapporo is listed below.

- Area: 46.42 square km
- Population: 211,233
- Households: 115,362
- Chūō-ku Ward Office: Minami 3 Jo Nishi 11 Chome, Chūō-ku, Sapporo-shi (city)
- Zipcode: 060-8612

== Education ==
=== University ===
==== Public ====
- Sapporo Medical University
- Sapporo City University, Soen Campus and Satellite Campus

==== Private ====
- Hokkai Gakuen University, Yamahana Campus

=== High schools ===
==== Public ====
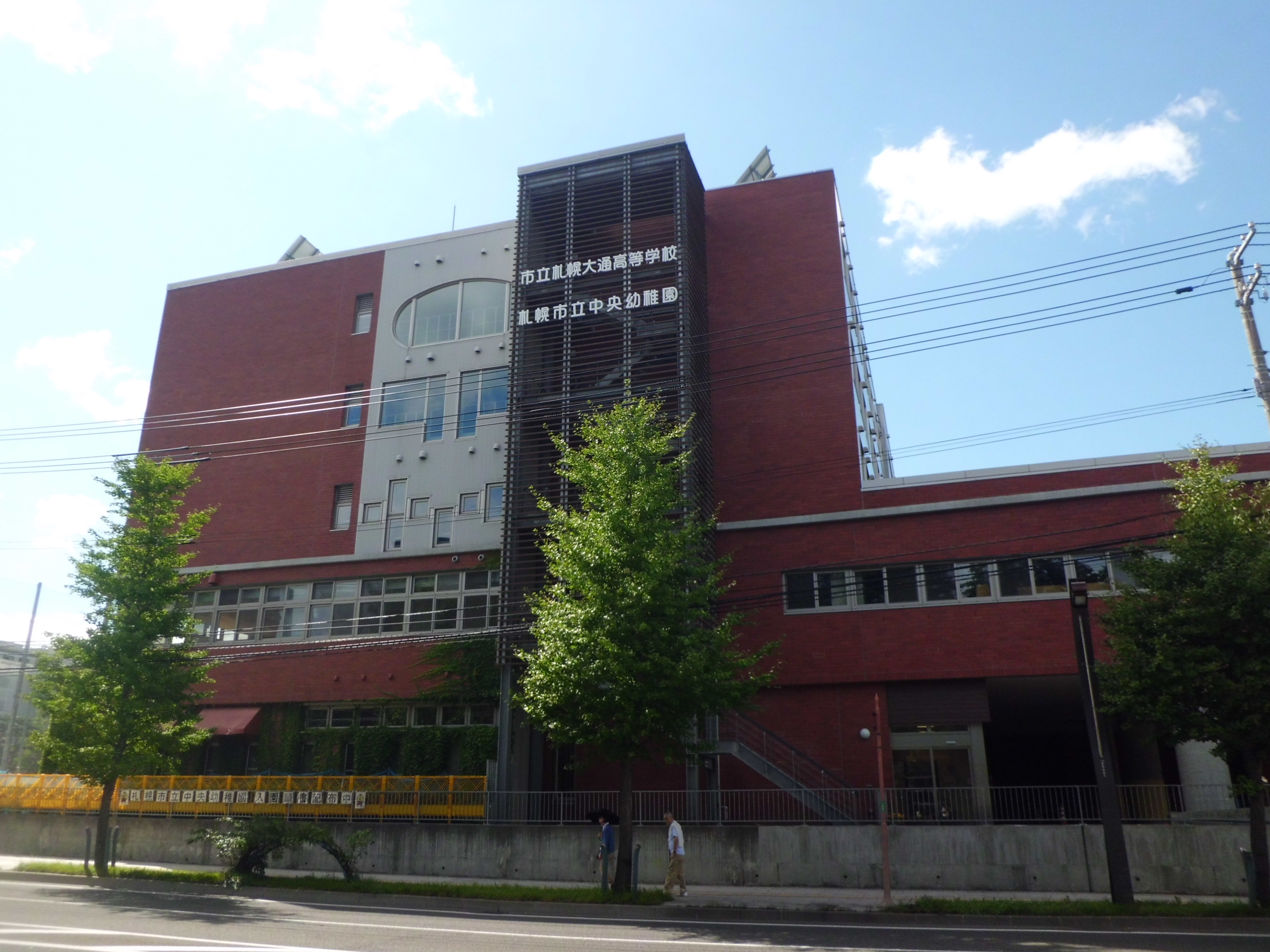
Sapporo Odori High School

- Hokkaido Sapporo Nishi High School
- Hokkaido Sapporo Minami High School
- Hokkaido Sapporo Asahigaoka High School
- Sapporo Odori High School

==== Private ====
- Sapporo Seishu High School
- Sapporo Ryukoku Gakuen High School
- Sapporo Sacred Heart School High School
- Hokusei Gakuen Girls' High School

=== Other ===
The South Korean government maintains the Korea Education Institution (Korean: 삿포로한국교육원; Japanese: 札幌韓国教育院) in Chuo-ku.

== Transportation ==
=== Rail ===
- JR Hokkaido
  - Hakodate Main Line, Sasshō Line: Sōen Station, Naebo Station
- Sapporo Municipal Subway
  - Namboku Line: Sapporo - Ōdōri - Susukino - Nakajima-Kōen - Horohira-Bashi
  - Tōzai Line: Nishi-Nijūhatchōme - Maruyama-Kōen - Nishi-Jūhatchōme - Nishi-Jūitchōme - Ōdōri - Bus Center-Mae
  - Tōhō Line: Sapporo - Ōdōri - Hōsui-Susukino
- Sapporo Streetcar
  - Ichijō Line
  - Yamahana Line
  - Yamahana-Nishi Line

=== Road ===
- Route 5
- Route 12
- Route 36

== Points of interest ==
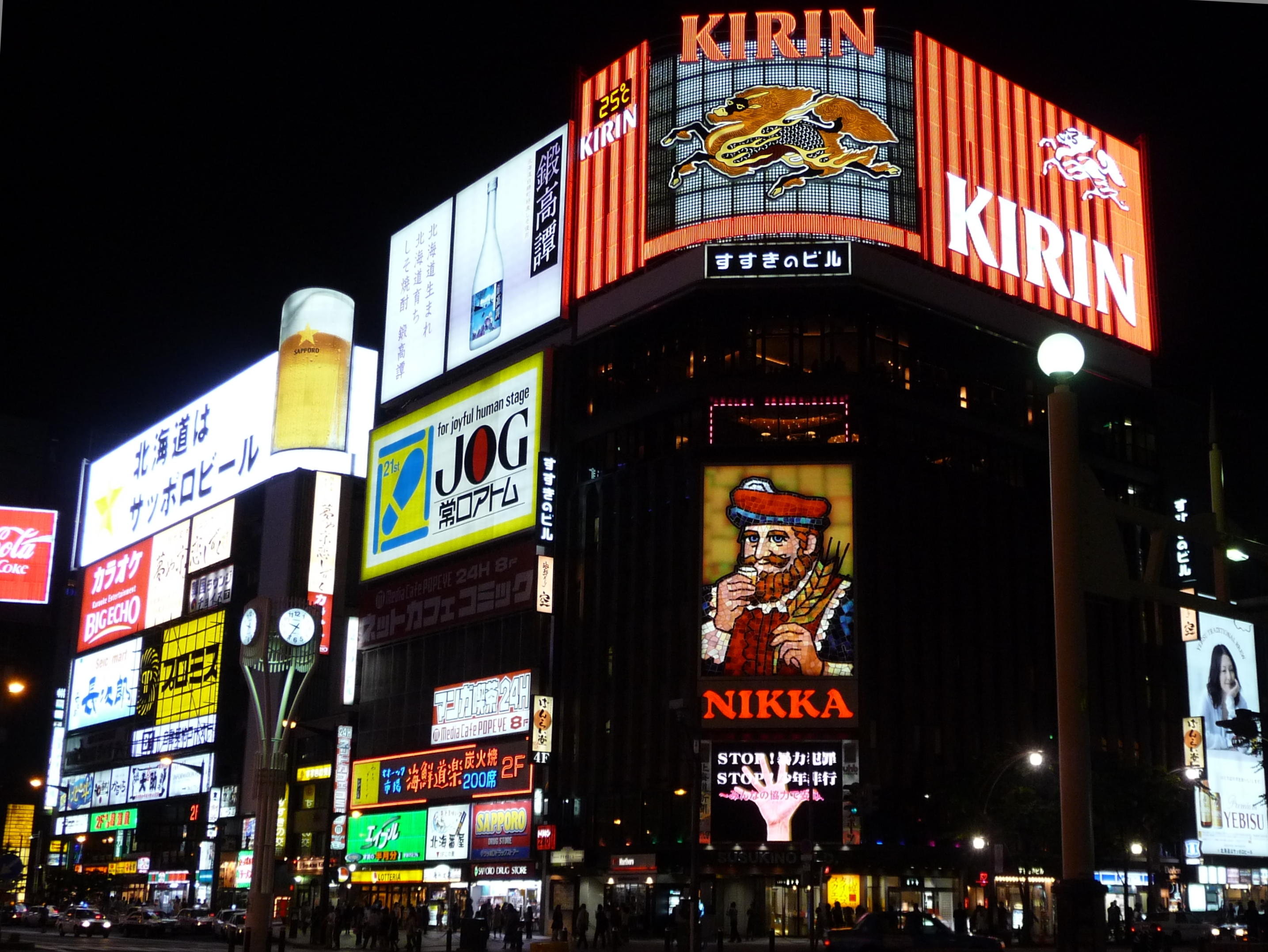
Susukino

- Sapporo Clock Tower
- Former Hokkaidō government office building
- Odori Park
- Maruyama Baseball Stadium
- Okurayama Ski Jump Stadium
- Susukino
- Tanukikōji Shopping Arcade
- Hokkaido Shrine
- Hōheikan
- Hongō Shin Memorial Museum of Sculpture
