= Sapporo Concert Hall =

Concert hall in Sapporo, Hokkaido

Coordinates: 43°2′39.22″N 141°21′9.77″E

Sapporo Concert Hall "Kitara"
- Kitara
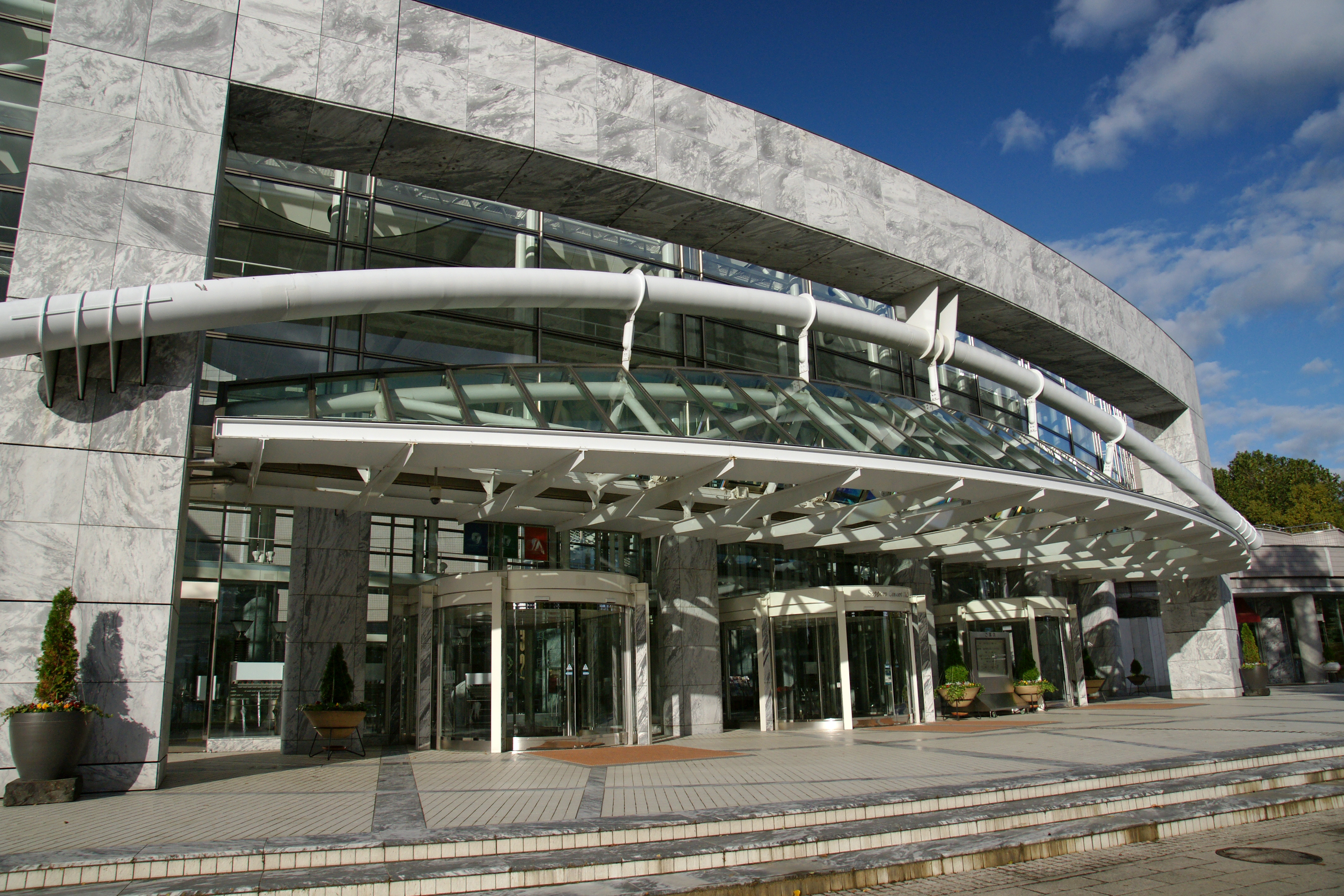
- Outside view of the Sapporo Concert Hall
- Interactive map of Sapporo Concert Hall "Kitara"
- Location: Nakajima Park, Chūō-ku, Sapporo, Japan
- Owner: Sapporo City
- Capacity: 2,008 (large main hall)
- Type: Concert Hall

Construction
- Opened: 1997

Website
- www.kitara-sapporo.or.jp

Sapporo Concert Hall Kitara (札幌コンサートホールKitara), is a municipal musical venue located in Nakajima Park, Sapporo, established in 1997, the building is owned by Sapporo City, The vineyard style music hall, known for having a huge organ built by Alfred Kern & Fils Manufacture D'Orgues in the main music hall. When Simon Rattle visited with the City of Birmingham Symphony Orchestra in 1998, he described the hall as "the best modern concert hall in the world".

== Overview ==
The building was built on July 4, 1997. Prior to its construction, the nickname for the concert hall "Kitara" had been chosen in March 1995. The nickname is derived from "Kithara", an ancient Greek musical instrument in the zither family, and also the term "Kita", which means "north" in Japanese. The building area covers 8,383,291 m² in total, the number of floors is 3 above ground and 2 underground, and the Hokkaido Engineering Consultants Co., Ltd is the main builder for the concert hall.

The concert hall is home to the Sapporo Symphony Orchestra, and its regular concert is held in the hall each year. The hall is one of the venues of the Pacific Music Festival (PMF), an event started with the idea of Leonard Bernstein in 1990.

== Facilities ==
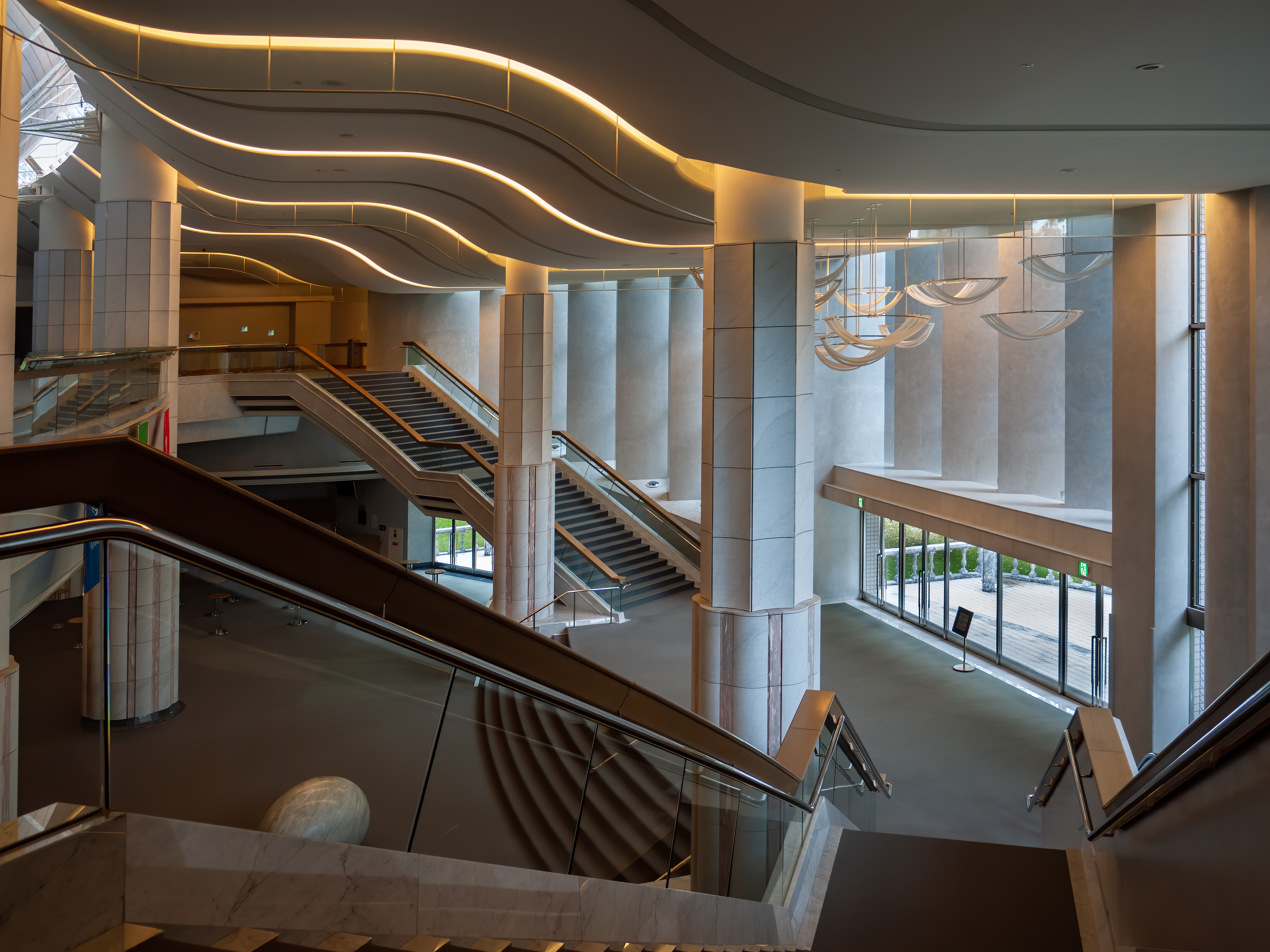
Foyer of the Sapporo Concert Hall

The building of the Sapporo Concert Hall houses a large main hall, small chamber music hall, and rehearsal rooms. A restaurant, nursery room, and museum shop are also located in the building.

The arena-style large main hall has a capacity of 28,800 m³, and installs 2,008 seats for audiences. Above the main hall, a huge pipe organ is installed. The organ was manufactured by an organ builder, Alfred Kern & Fils Manufacture D'Orgues based in Strasbourg, France, and annually an exclusive organ player is invited from overseas. Having 4,976 pipes, the pipe organ is modelled after needle leaved trees in Hokkaidō prefecture.

The shoebox style small chamber music hall has seating capacity of 453. The restaurant with terrace is located on the ground floor, and a bar, cafe, are open during the concert. The main concert hall and the small chamber music hall also have seats designed for handicapped audiences.

== Organists ==
1998-1999 Pascal Marsault

1999-2000 Yves Lafargue

2000-2001 Laszlo Fassang (HUNG)

2001-2002 Juan María Pedrero (ESP)

2002-2003 Monica Melcova (SVK)

2003-2004 Jean-Philippe Merckaert (BEL)

2004-2005 Matthieu Magnuszewski

2005-2006 Jens Korndoerfer (GER)

2006-2007 Ghislain Leroy

2007-2008 Sylvain Heili

2008-2009 Cindy Castillo (BEL)

2009-2010 Laurent-Cyprien Giraud

2010-2011 Coralie Amedjkane

2011-2012 Florent Galliere

2012-2013 Maria Magdalena Kaczor (POL)

2013-2014 Octavian Saunier

2014-2015 ***

2015-2016 John Walthausen (USA)

2016-2017 Davide Mariano (IT)

2017-2018 Martin Gregorius (POL)

2018-2019 Simon Bollenot

2019-2020 Adam Tabajdi (HUNG)

== See also ==
- List of concert halls
