= Higashi-Kuyakusho-Mae Station =

Subway station in Sapporo, Japan

Coordinates: 43°4′41.349″N 141°21′53.05″E

H05 Higashi-Kuyakusho-Mae Station 東区役所前駅
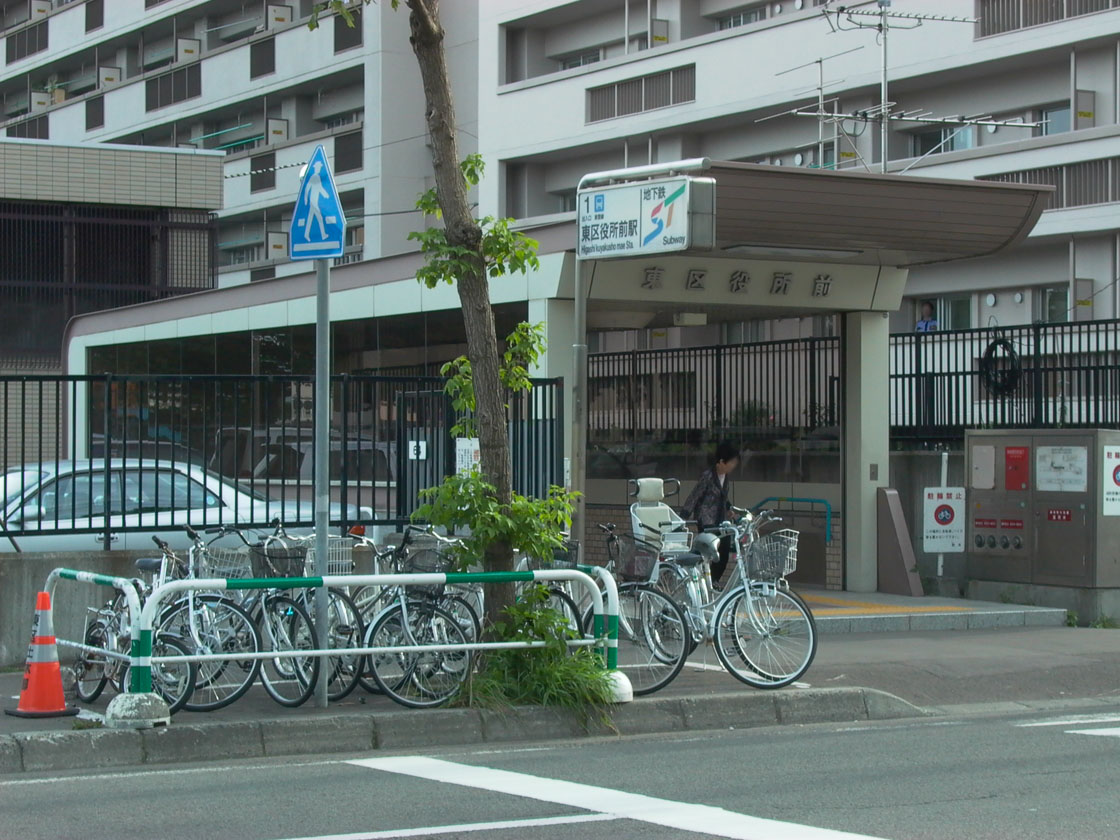
- Station exit 1

General information
- Location: Higashi, Sapporo, Hokkaido; Japan
- System: Sapporo Municipal Subway station
- Operator: Sapporo City Transportation Bureau
- Line: Tōhō Line

Construction
- Accessible: Yes

Other information
- Station code: H05

History
- Opened: 2 December 1988; 37 years ago

Services
Preceding station	Sapporo Municipal Subway	Following station
Kanjō-Dōri-Higashi H04 towards Sakaemachi	Tōhō Line	Kita-Jūsan-Jō-Higashi H06 towards Fukuzumi
Location

Higashi-Kuyakusho-Mae Station (東区役所前駅) is a Sapporo Municipal Subway in Higashi-ku, Sapporo, Hokkaido, Japan. The station number is H05.

== Platforms ==
1	■ Tōhō Line	for Fukuzumi
2	■ Tōhō Line	for Sakaemachi

== History ==
The station opened on 2 December 1988 coinciding with the opening of the Toho Line from Sakaemachi Station to Hōsui-Susukino Station.

== Surrounding area ==
- Sapporo Beer Museum
- Sapporo Ōtani University
- Sapporo Otani Junior College
