= Kita-Jūsan-Jō-Higashi Station =

Subway station in Sapporo, Japan

Coordinates: 43°4′36.565″N 141°21′17.627″E

H06 Kita-Jūsan-Jō-Higashi Station 北13条東駅
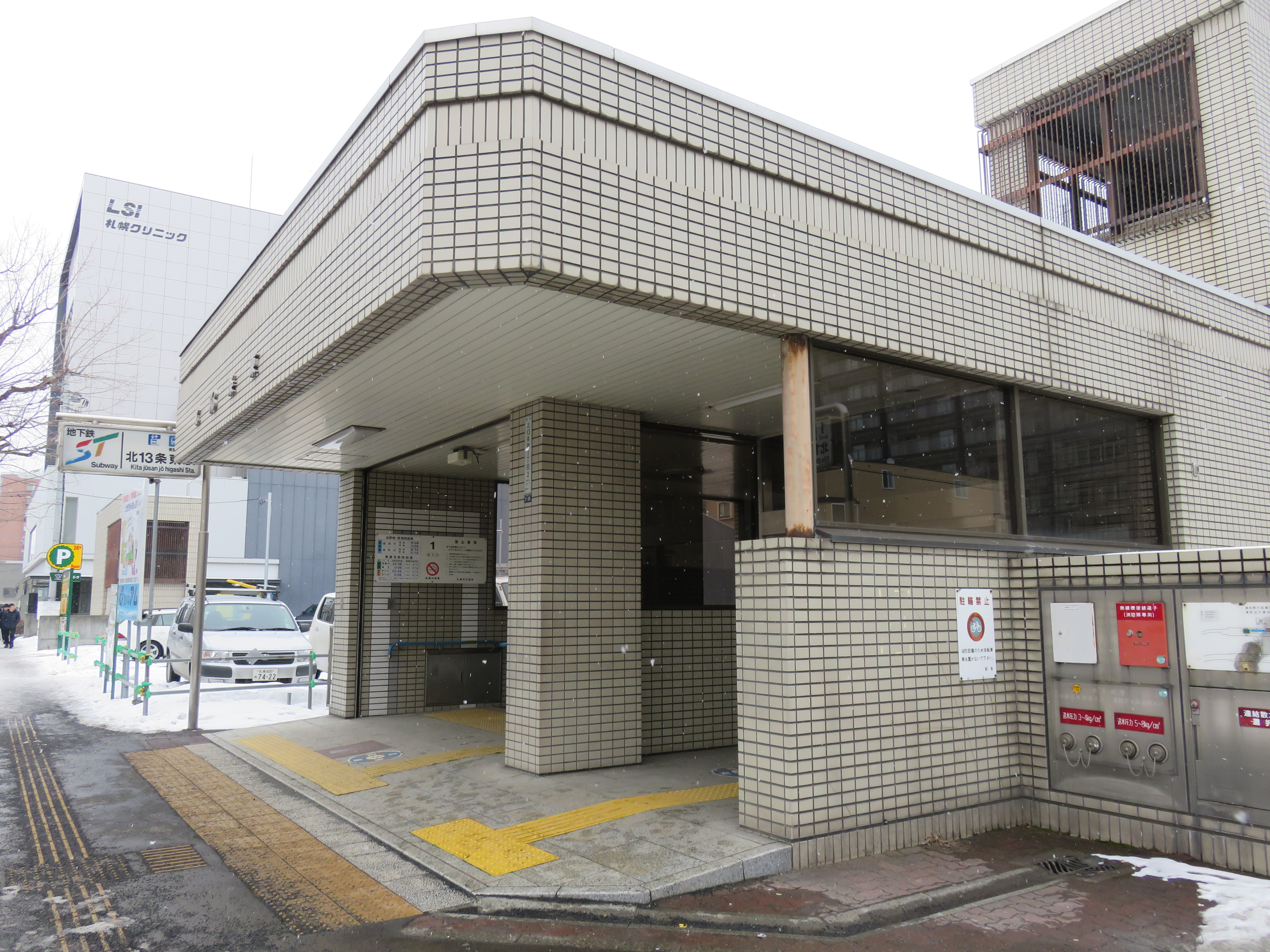
- 2016

General information
- Location: Higashi, Sapporo, Hokkaido; Japan
- System: Sapporo Municipal Subway station
- Line: Tōhō Line

Construction
- Accessible: Yes

Other information
- Station code: H06

History
- Opened: 2 December 1988; 37 years ago

Services
Preceding station	Sapporo Municipal Subway	Following station
Higashi-Kuyakusho-Mae H05 towards Sakaemachi	Tōhō Line	Sapporo H07 towards Fukuzumi
Location

Kita-Jūsan-Jō-Higashi Station (北13条東駅) is a Sapporo Municipal Subway in Higashi-ku, Sapporo, Hokkaido, Japan. The station number is H06.

== Platforms ==
1	■ Tōhō Line	for Fukuzumi
2	■ Tōhō Line	for Sakaemachi

== History ==
The station opened on 2 December 1988 coinciding with the opening of the Toho Line from Sakaemachi Station to Hōsui-Susukino Station.

== Surrounding area ==
- Kita-Jūni-Jō Station, Namboku Line
- Japan National Route 5
- Tenshi College
