= Higashi-ku, Sapporo =

Coordinates: 43°4′34″N 141°21′49″E

Higashi 東区
- Ward
- Higashi Ward
- Flag Seal

- Location of Higashi-ku in Sapporo
- Country: Japan
- Prefecture: Hokkaidō
- City: Sapporo
- Established: April 1, 1972

Government
  - Ward representatives: Ayako Fuchigami; Hiromi Achira; Mayumi Yamazaki; Yasuji Watanabe
- Political parties: CDP (one seat); Komeito (one seat); JIP(one seat); LDP (one seat)

Area
  - Total: 56.97 km^{2} (22.00 sq mi)

Population (2021)
  - Total: 262,195
  - Density: 4,602/km^{2} (11,920/sq mi)
- Estimation as of August 31, 2021
- Time zone: UTC+9 (Japan Standard Time)
- Address: 7-1 Kita Juichijyo Higashi, Higashi-ku, Sapporo-shi, Hokkaido
- Website: Higashi Ward Office

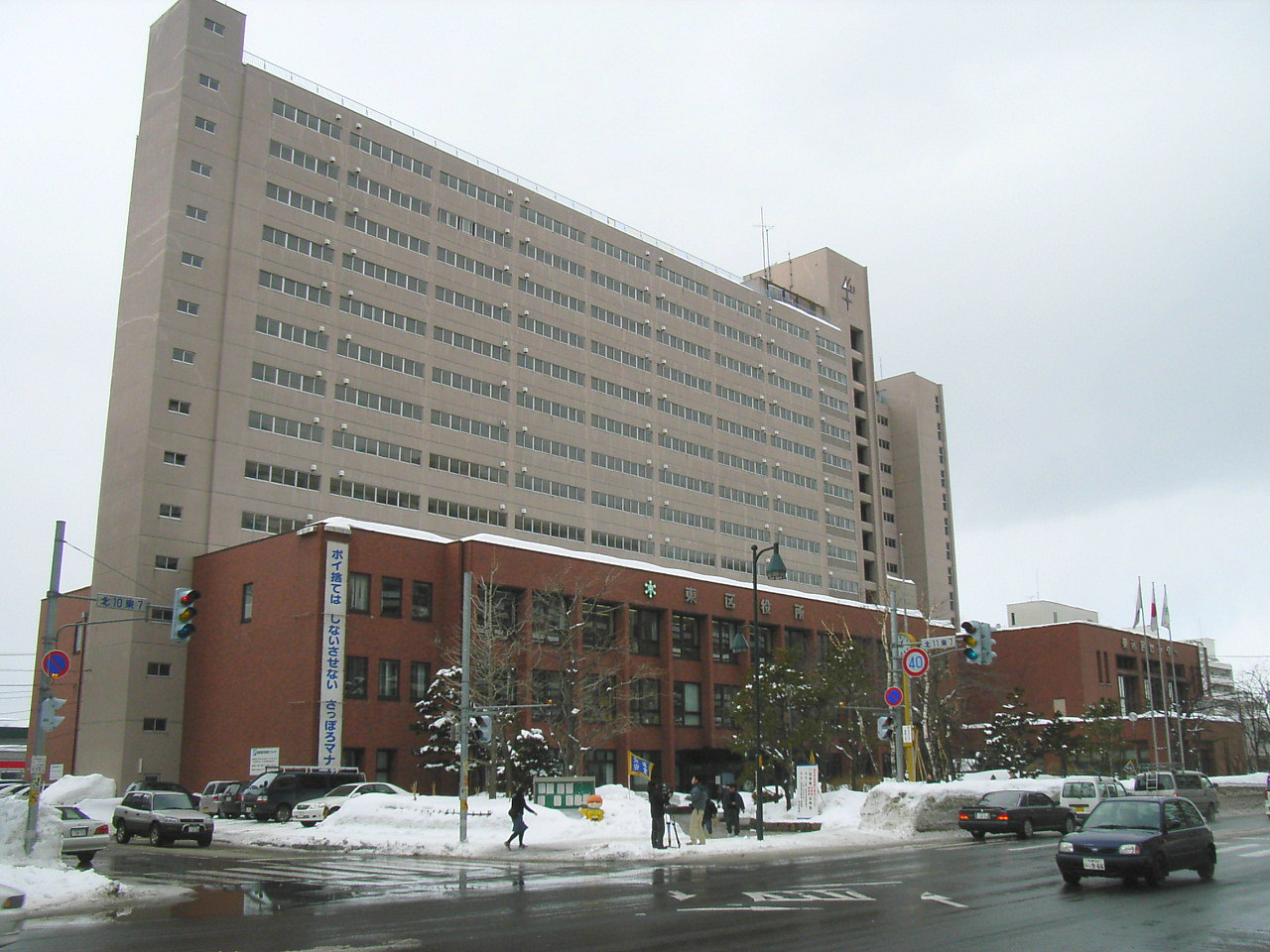
Higashi-ku, ward office

Higashi-ku (東区) is one of the 10 wards in Sapporo, Hokkaidō, Japan. It is directly translated as "east ward", and is neighboured to Kita-ku, Chūō-ku, Shiroishi-ku, Ebetsu, Tōbetsu.

== Overview ==
According to the 2008 registry of residential addresses, 254,360 people lived in Higashi-ku. It is 57.13 km^{2} (22.06 sq mi) in area, and a number of rivers are located in the ward including the Toyohira River.

The ward has a mascot character, Tappy, which was designed to be an onion-themed fairy; it was named in 1993, and is a portmanteau of "Tamanegi" (meaning onion in Japanese) and "happy". The onion is a vegetable raised in Higashi-ku, and therefore Tappy is associated with onions.

== History ==
Originally, at the place where Higashi-ku is, Naebo Village and Okadama Village were established by pioneers in 1870. Sapporo Village was established in 1871, and Kariki Village was established in 1873. In 1902, Naebo Village, Okadama Village, and Kariki Village were merged into Sapporo Village, which covered nearly the same extent as the current Higashi-ku.

In 1955, Sapporo Village was merged into Sapporo City. In 1972, Sapporo was listed as one of the cities designated by government ordinance, which enabled Higashi-ku to be established. In 1988, the Tōhō line of the Sapporo Municipal Subway was laid, and subway stations were placed in Higashi-ku.

== Economy ==
The headquarters of Hokkaido Air System is located on the property of Okadama Airport in Okadama-chō. Previously the airline was headquartered in the New Chitose Airport terminal in Chitose.

In April 2004 Air Nippon Network was headquartered in Higashi-ku.

== Education ==
=== Universities ===
- Sapporo Ōtani University
- Tenshi College
- Sapporo University of Health Sciences

=== junior college ===
- Sapporo Otani Junior College

=== Secondary school ===
- Sapporo Kaisei Secondary school

=== High schools ===
==== Public ====
- Hokkaido Sapporo Okadama High School
- Hokkaido Sapporo Toryo High School
- Hokkaido Sapporo Toho High School
- Hokkaido Sapporo Kaisei High School

==== Private ====
- Sapporo Otani High School
- Sapporo Kosei High School
- Sapporo Hokuto High School

== Transportation ==
=== Air ===
- Okadama Airport - an airport located in Okadama.

=== Rail ===
- Sapporo Municipal Subway
  - Tōhō Line: Sakaemachi - Shindō-Higashi - Motomachi - Kanjō-Dōri-Higashi - Higashi-Kuyakusho-Mae - Kita-Jūsan-Jō-Higashi

=== Road ===
- Sasson Expressway: Kariki IC - Fushiko IC - Sapporo-Kita IC
- Route 5

== Points of interest ==
- Moerenuma park - a park designed by Isamu Noguchi, an American-Japanese artist.
- Sapporo Satoland - one of the venues of the Sapporo Snow Festival.
- Sapporo Beer Museum - the only beer museum in Japan.
- Sapporo Community Dome - a sports and event venue, which is also known as its nickname "Tsu-Dome".
- Ario - a large shopping mall.
