= Odori Park =

Park in Sapporo, Japan

Coordinates: 43°03′35″N 141°20′47″E

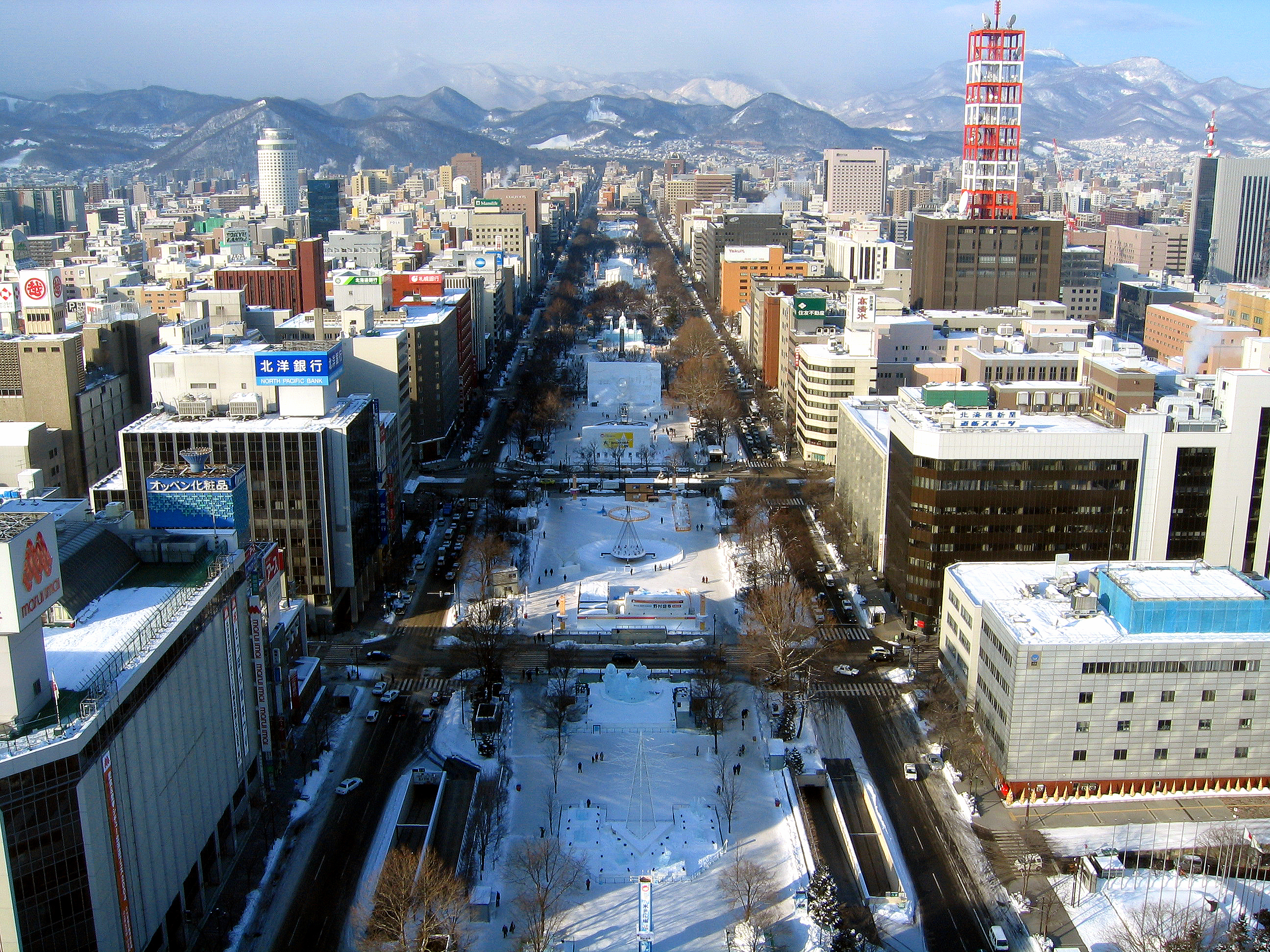
- View of the Odori Park during the Sapporo Snow Festival from the observation deck of the Sapporo TV Tower
- Interactive map of Odori Park
- Type: municipal
- Location: Sapporo, Japan
- Area: 78,901 m²
- Created: 1869
- Operator: Sapporo City
- Status: Open all year

Odori Park (大通公園, Ōdōri Kōen) is a park located in the heart of Sapporo, Hokkaido, Japan. Ōdōri (大通) means "large street" in Japanese. It stretches east to west through Nishi 1 chōme, Ōdōri to Nishi 12 chōme, Ōdōri ("Nishi" means west, and "chōme" is a block in Japanese), and divides the city into north and south sections. Odori Park spans about 1.5 km and covers 78,901 m². During the urban planning of Sapporo, it was originally designated as the main street but it eventually became a park. Throughout the year, many events and ceremonies such as the Sapporo Lilac Festival and the Sapporo Snow Festival are held in the park, and local landmarks including the Sapporo TV Tower and the Sapporo City Archive Museum are located within its boundaries.

== History ==
=== Odori as a street ===
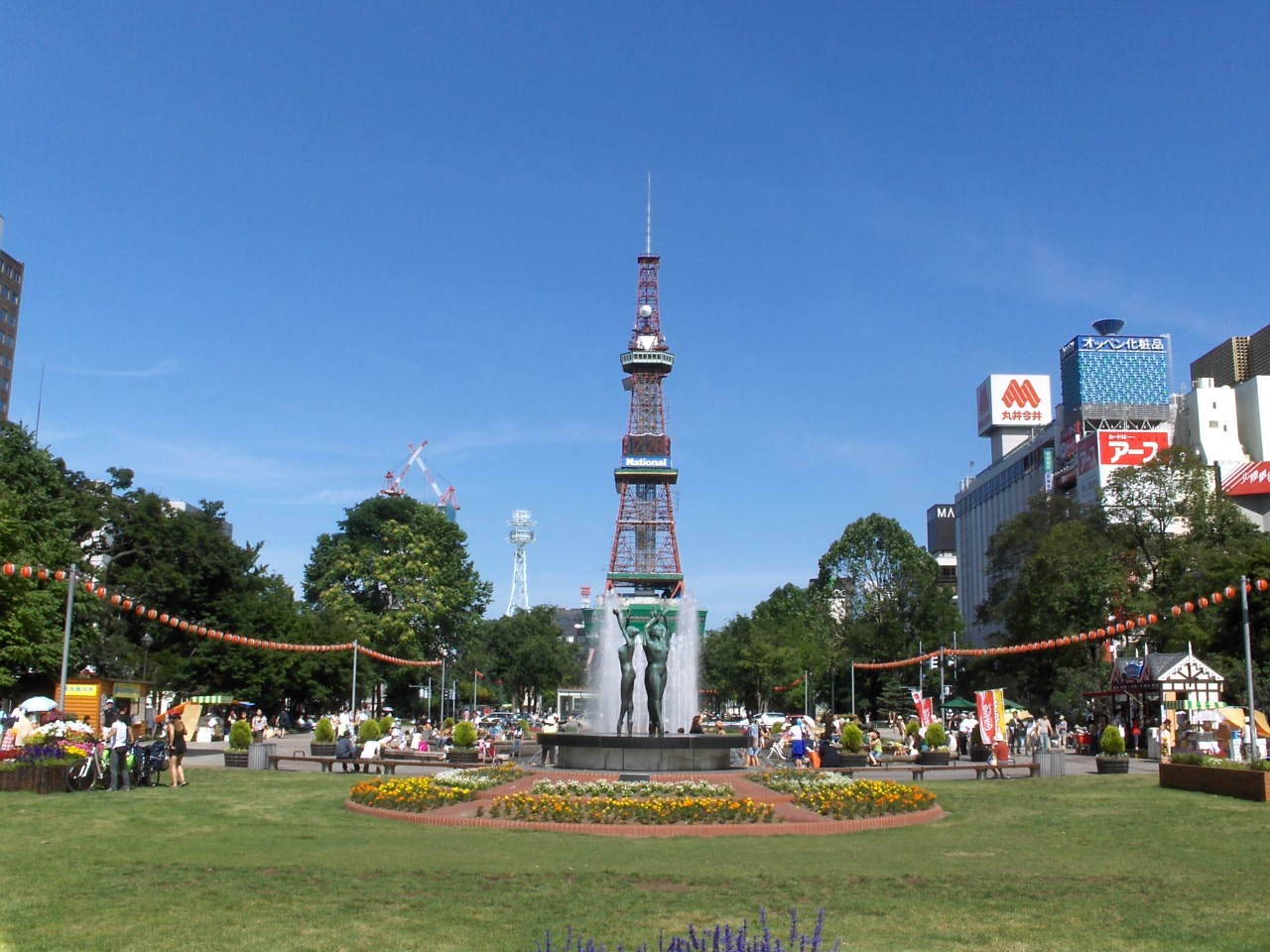
Odori Park and Sapporo TV Tower

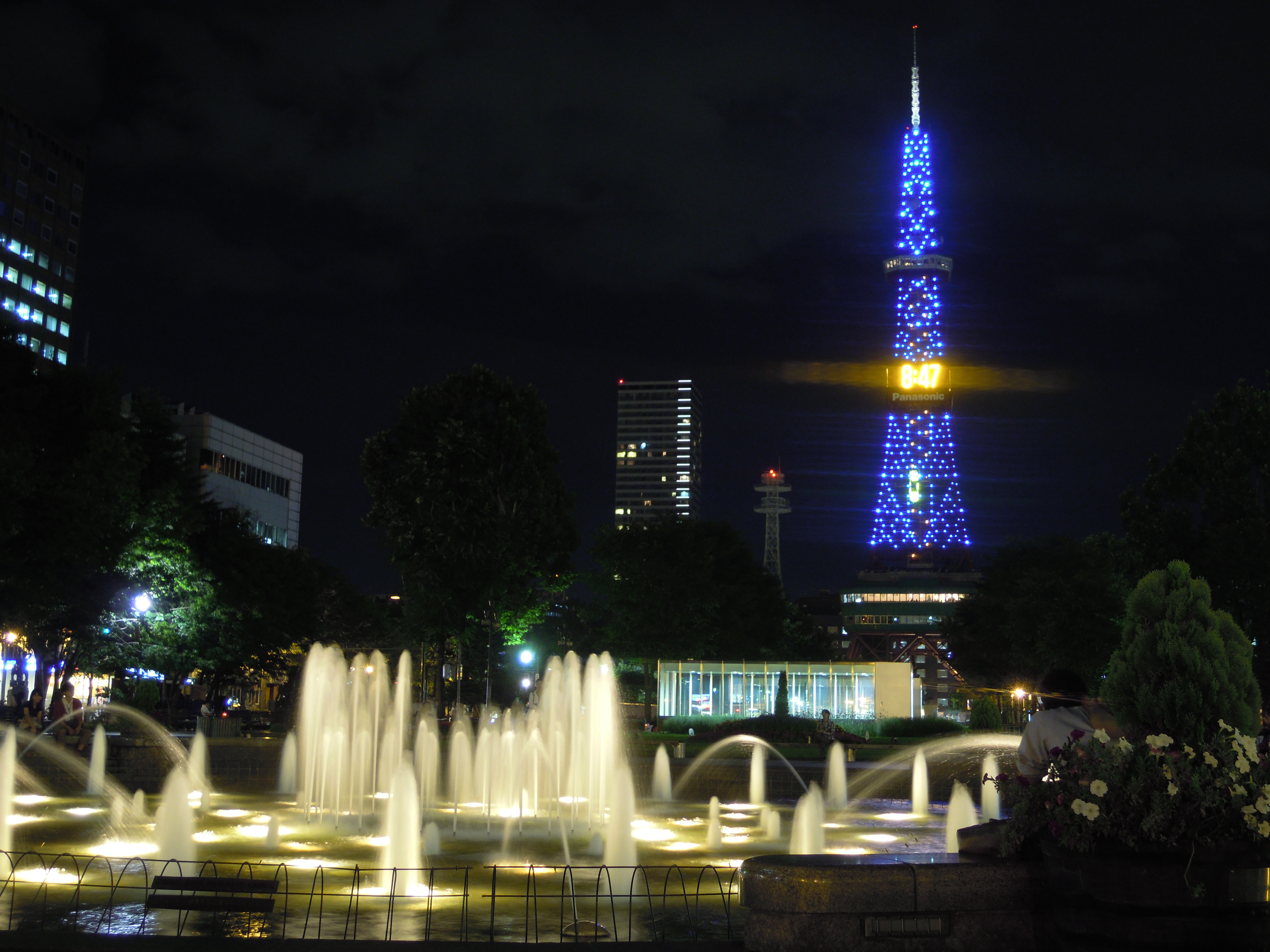
Night

In 1869, Shima Yoshitake, a judge sent by the government as the commissioner responsible for founding a central city in Hokkaido, came to Sapporo and developed a city plan that divided Sapporo City into North and South sections by means of a large street. In his plan, the northern part of Sapporo would have been set aside for public servants and offices, while the southern part would have been a residential area. In his plan the location of the dividing street was different from the current location of Odori Park.

After Shima's dismissal for misgovernment in Hokkaido, Iwamura Michitoshi supervised the urban planning of Sapporo. He remodelled the original plan in 1871, and Kabō-sen (火防線) was constructed in the place where Odori Park is currently located. The Kabō-sen was a firebreak consisting of 105 metres of largely vacant land, which often prevented the progress of fire during the Meiji period.

In 1872, the street was named "Shiribeshi Dōri" (後志通), but this name was not popular and it was renamed "Ōdōri" in June 1881.

In Meiji period, the Nishi 1 and 2 chōme areas of Odori street were a little narrower than the other parts. This was because both the Hōheikan, a hotel in the European architectural style which was later moved to Nakajima Park, which was located in Nishi 1 chōme, and the telephone exchange building located in Nishi 2 chōme, protruded over Ōdōri street. Since the first Agricultural Interim Fair was held at Nishi 2 chōme and Nishi 3 chōme in 1878, Odori street has been the place where a number of events and ceremonies have taken place.

The western parts of Odori street, however, were not as busy as the eastern side such as Nishi 2 chōme, and the military parade grounds of the Tondenhei, a unit of Hokkaido farmer-soldiers, were constructed from Nishi 10 chōme to Nishi 12 chōme. After the abolition of the Tondenhei, some of the athletic meetings of neighbourhood schools were held in the Odori, but gradually the street was abandoned and used as a garbage and snow dumping ground. A popular complaint was that a large part of the Odori in the heart of the city has been abandoned, and there was pressure to develop the area for housing lots, but this did not happen.

=== Odori as a park ===
In 1876, 6600 m² of the flower garden was constructed on the grounds of Nishi 3 chōme and Nishi 4 chōme, and in 1909, the street was arranged as a walking area under the direction of Yasuhei Nagaoka, a Japanese landscape and garden planner. This may be the origin of the Odori "Park".

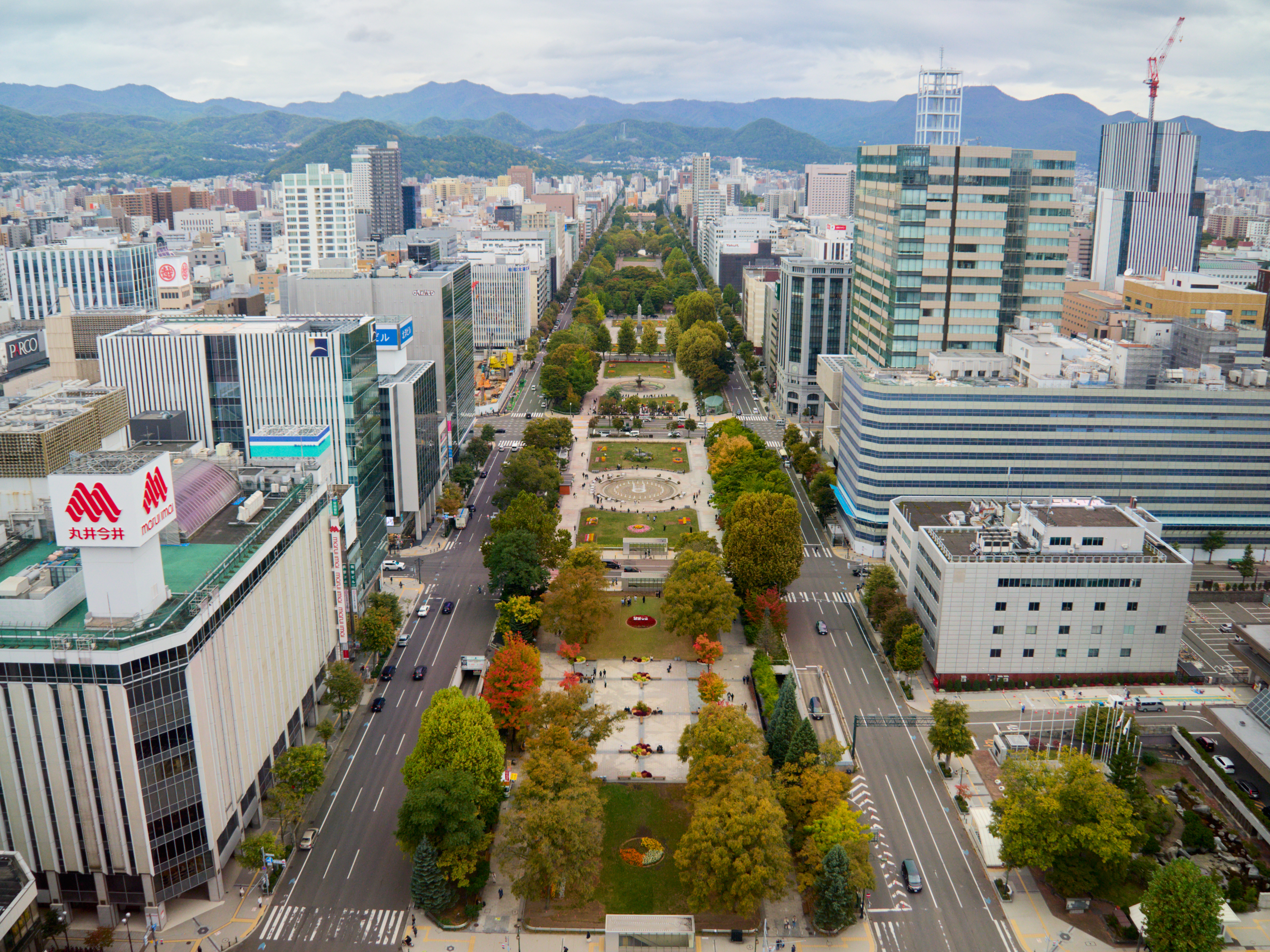
Odori Park in early autumn

During World War II, the Odori Park was given over to potato production. After the War ended and supply of food improved, Odori once again became a garbage and snow dumping ground. The occupation forces took over a part of Odori Park and constructed a baseball field and tennis court, and after Odori Park was handed over by the Allied Powers, several athletic fields were created in the west of the Odori.

The development of Odori as a park has resumed since it was returned by the occupation forces in 1950. Since that time, many flower gardens have been created by assigning grounds of Odori to garden design companies. Currently, each flower garden is adorned with a nameplate of the company which showcases its garden planning skills in that area throughout the year.

== Overview ==
Each block in Odori Park has rectangular grounds which are 65 metres north to south, and 110 metres east to west, and it ranges from Nishi 1 chōme to Nishi 13 chōme, Ōdōri. Roadways and 4 metres of sidewalks surround each block, and people must cross zebra crossings between each block. The area of Nishi 1 chōme block is a little smaller than other blocks in Odori Park, and Nishi 8 chōme and Nishi 9 chōme blocks are joined together.

→													Sousei; River
13 chōme	12 chōme	11 chōme	10 chōme	9 chōme	8 chōme	7 chōme	6 chōme	5 chōme	4 chōme	3 chōme	2 chōme	1 chōme	Sousei; River
←													Sousei; River

Sections below list landmarks, monuments, and features including buildings removed in the past.

=== Nishi 1 chōme ===
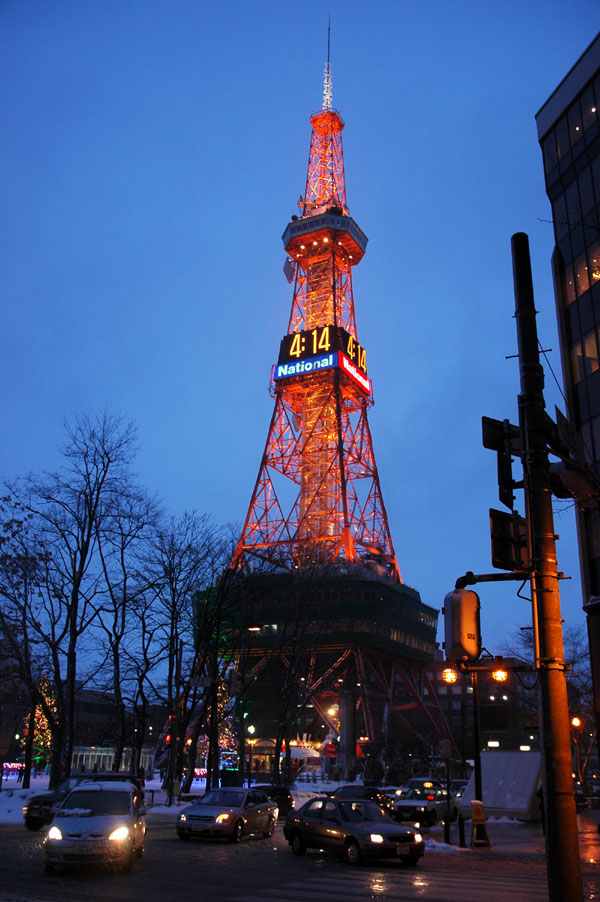
Sapporo TV Tower

- Sapporo Municipal Subway, Ōdōri Station (Tōhō-line) is located.
- Sapporo TV Tower – located in the eastern half of the Nishi 1 chōme block. Visitors can view the scenery of the entire Odori Park and Sapporo City from its observation deck. The tower was erected in 1957.
- Hōheikan (moved) – A hotel in the European style built in 1880. Its garden protruded over Odori Park. Later, this building was used as community centre and assembly hall. The Hōheikan was moved to Nakajima Park in Sapporo, when the construction of the Sapporo TV Tower and new assembly hall were planned.
- Sapporo Transportation Authority Building (demolished) – After World War II, a garage, dormitory, and office were placed in the south of the Hōheikan.

=== Nishi 2 chōme ===
- Sapporo Municipal Subway, Ōdōri Station (Tōhō-line) is located here.
- Monument of the first telephone exchange in Hokkaidō – the area of Sapporo Communications Bureau and Sapporo Post Office protruded over the northern half of the Nishi 2 chōme block. The monument was erected in 1973.
- Volleyball court (removed) – existed for a brief period after World War II.

=== Nishi 3 chōme ===
- The road between Nishi 3 chōme and 4 chōme is Ekimae-Dōri, a street which leads directly to Sapporo Station.
- Sapporo Municipal Subway, Ōdōri Station (Tōhō-line and Tōzai-line) is located here.
- Monument of Takuboku Ishikawa – a monument built in 1981, on which is engraved a poem by Japanese poet, Takuboku Ishikawa.
- The statue of the general Takeshirō Nagayama (removed) – erected in November 1909. In 1943, it was taken by the government as a metal resource for use in construction of weapons and other items during World War II.
- A church (demolished) – built by the American army which occupied Sapporo after World War II. It was demolished after the restoration of Odori Park.

=== Nishi 4 chōme ===
- Sapporo Municipal Subway, Ōdōri Station (Tōhō-line and Tōzai-line).
- The monument of Yoshii Isamu.
- A baseball field (removed) – existed for a brief period after World War II.

=== Nishi 5 chōme ===
- Seion Monument (聖恩碑) – a stone obelisk built in thanks to the Emperor of Japan in 1938.
- An athletic field (removed) – school sports were held in this field.
- A tennis court (removed) – existed for a brief period after World War II.

=== Nishi 6 chōme ===
- An outdoor stage
- Monument of development – built in 1886 and placed at Kairakuen in Sapporo, later relocated to Odori Park in 1899.
- A tennis court and basketball court (removed) – existed for a brief period after World War II.

=== Nishi 7 chōme ===
- Monument of group return
- The statue of Kiyotaka Kuroda (removed) – erected in August 1903. In 1943, it was taken by the government as scrap metal for war use.
- A baseball field (removed) – existed for a brief period after World War II.

=== Nishi 8 chōme ===
- There are no roadways between Nishi 8 chōme and Nishi 9 chōme, and these thus two blocks are joined together.
- Black Slide Mantra – a twisted slide created by Japanese-American artist, Isamu Noguchi. In the spring of 1988, when the agreement to construct Moerenuma Park between Sapporo City and Noguchi was announced, the creation of this slide was also planned. Black Slide Mantra was exhibited in the Venice Biennale, and is the sister version of the white "Slide Mantra" in Miami, Florida, United States. Placement of the Black Slide Mantra was the main cause of Nishi 8 chōme and Nishi 9 chōme being joined.

=== Nishi 9 chōme ===
- A monument of Arishima Takeo
- A children's play area, including swings, slides and a water play area.

=== Nishi 10 chōme ===
- The statue of Kiyotaka Kuroda – recreated after World War II.
- The statue of Horace Capron

=== Nishi 11 chōme ===
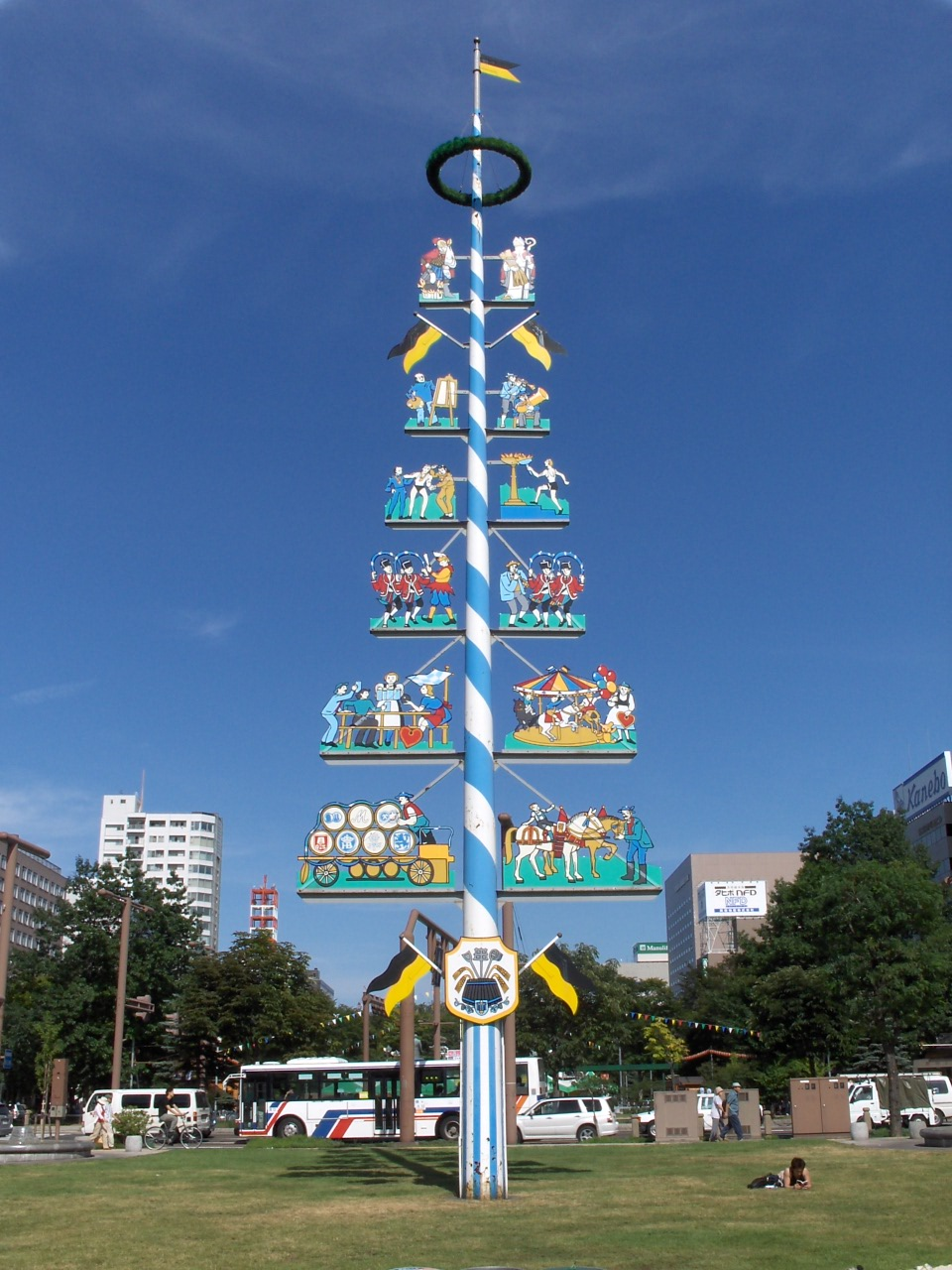
Maibaum in Nishi 11 chome

- Sapporo Municipal Subway, Nishi 11 chōme Station (Tōzai-line)
- Maibaum – a decorated pole in the German tradition. The first Maibaum was given by Munich, Germany, a sister city of Sapporo, and placed in 1976. The original Maibaum deteriorated and was removed in 2000, and later a remodelled version was erected. The pole is 25 metres high.
- Olympic Rings and a plaque commemorating the 1972 Winter Olympics which were held in Sapporo, including a picture of when the torch came through Odori Park on its way to the Olympic Stadium.
- The statue of Michitoshi Iwamura (removed) – a bronze statue of the pioneer of Sapporo City, erected in 1933. In 1943, it was taken by the government for reuse during World War II.

=== Nishi 12 chōme ===
- Sunk Garden – a flower garden with over 30 kinds of roses.

=== Nishi 13 chōme ===
- Formally, Nishi 13 chōme is outside of the Odori Park, but it has been regarded as a part of Odori Park since the Sapporo City Archive Museum was constructed.
- Sapporo City Archive Museum – constructed as Sapporo Court of Appeals in September 1926. The building was made of bricks, Sapporo soft stone, and reinforced concrete. The building was officially named Sapporo City Archive Museum in 1973, and listed in Registered Tangible Cultural Properties of Japan in 1997.

== Events ==
It snows in winter in Sapporo, and the White Illumination, an event during which the trees lining the Park are decorated with illuminations, takes place during that season. Every February, the Sapporo Snow Festival, a festival with snow statues and several events, is held throughout Odori Park. In recent years, this huge festival has had over two million visitors per year from all over Japan and the world.

The park is home to about 400 lilac trees, and hosts the Lilac Festival every May for about 10 days.

Every June, the Yosakoi Soran Festival, a huge dance festival in Hokkaido, is held in the Odori Park. A number of special stages are constructed, and thousands of dancers parade and dance down the streets and on the stages.

In summer, the park changes into a large beer garden. From Nishi 5 chōme to Nishi 8 chōme, major Japanese breweries including Sapporo Breweries Limited set up their own beer gardens, serving beers and snacks. The beer garden serving beers of the world is Nishi 10 chōme. Until 2003, a place providing beers from local microbreweries was constructed in Nishi 11 chōme.

The annual Hokkaido Marathon is staged from the park in late August.

The popular Autumn Fest takes place for about three weeks in September, and showcases food stalls by restaurants from around the city and beyond.

After concerns over the marathon events for the 2020 Summer Olympics after excessive heat during the 2019 World Athletics Championships in Doha, Qatar, World Athletics and the Tokyo Olympic Committee announced on 4 December 2019 the 2021 Olympic Marathon (date change announced 30 March 2020) would be held in Sapporo instead of Tokyo in an effort to avoid the hottest time of day.

== In popular culture ==
- Ōdōri Park is a major location featured in the video game Yakuza 5, and it is seen during the scene where the character Taiga Saejima kidnaps the boss of the Kitakata Family, Daizo Kitakata, for questioning.
- Ōdōri Park is also featured in an episode of the 1994 anime adaptation of Marmalade Boy.

== See also ==
- Chūō-ku, Sapporo
