= Sapporo Satoland =

Amusement park in Sapporo, Japan

Coordinates: 43°07′10″N 141°24′56″E

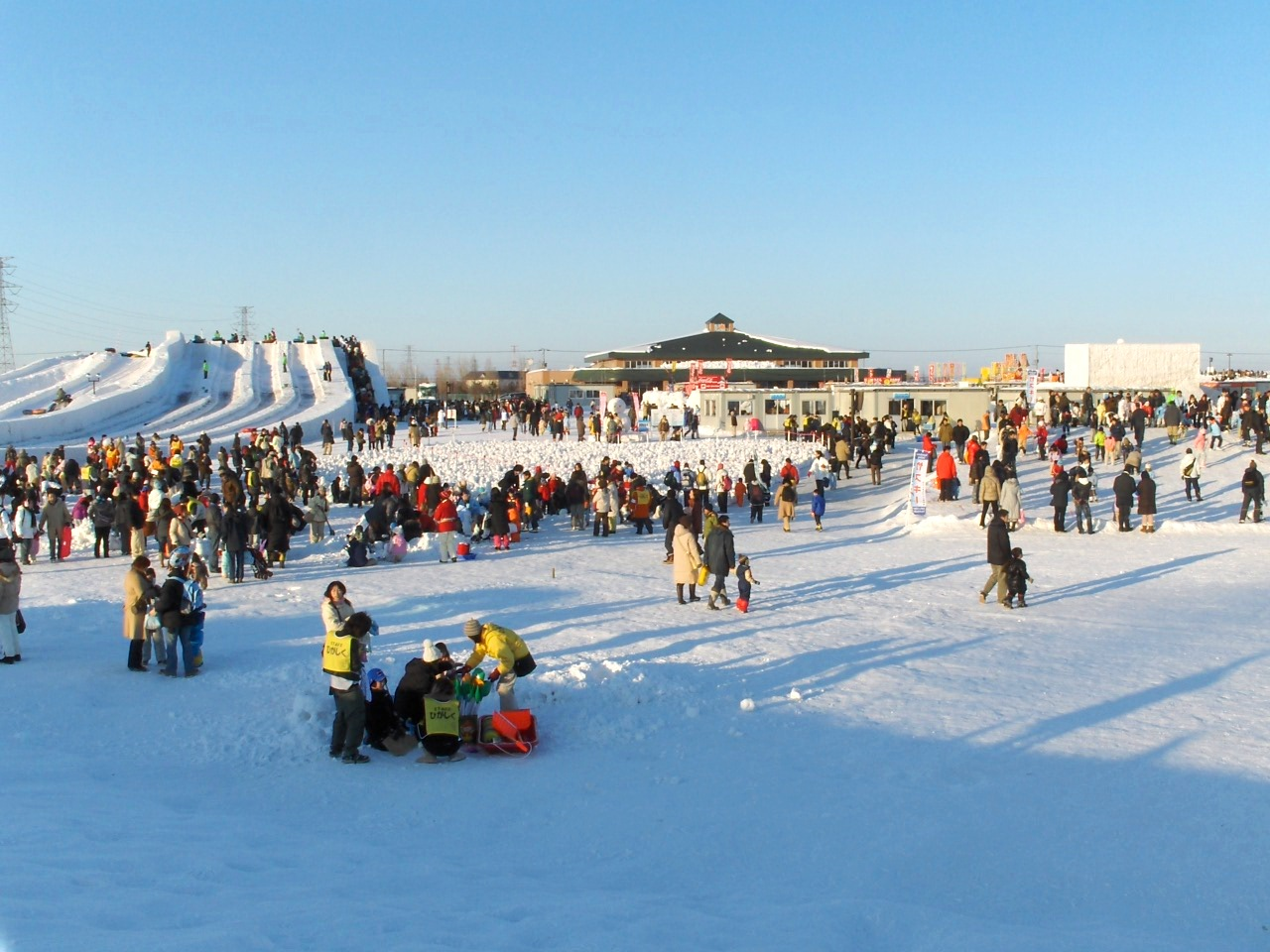
Satoland site of the Sapporo Snow Festival in 2008

Sapporo Satoland (サッポロさとらんど, Sapporo Satorando) is an amusement park located in Higashi-ku, Sapporo, Hokkaidō, Japan. Sapporo Satoland, which has an agricultural theme, was opened in 1995. Its official name is Sapporo Facility of Agricultural Experience and Interchange (札幌市農業体験交流施設, Sapporo Nōgyō Taiken Kōryū Shisetsu).

== History ==
The Sapporo Satoland was established in 1995. Facilities have been run by the Sato Mirai Project Group since April 1, 2006. After the expansion to the west side in 2004, the total area of the Satoland was extended to about 74 ha. The Sapporo Snow Festival, which has usually had three main sites, gave up using the Makomanai site in 2005, and moved instead to Satoland, where huge snow slides and a maze have featured during the festival. From the 2009 festival, the site switched to the nearby Sapporo Community Dome (Tsudome). Remains of the early Satsumon period, a prehistoric period in Hokkaidō between 9th and early 10th century, are located in the park, and grain relics show that there was cultivation here during the Satsumon period. Agricultural activities in the Satsumon period were previously unknown, and the relics in Satoland have provided a clue to understand the origin of agriculture in Hokkaidō prefecture.

== Overview ==
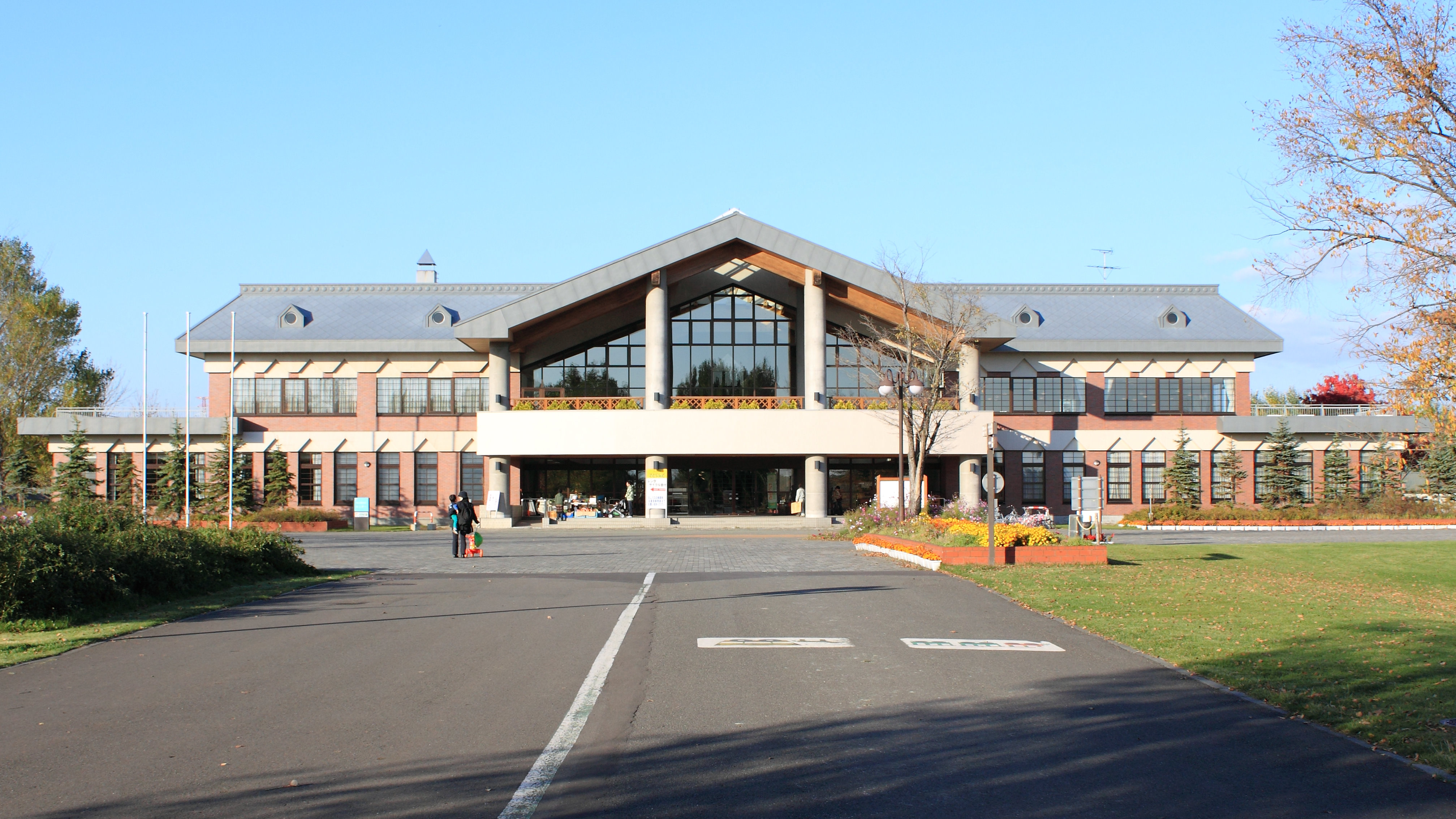
Satoland Centre

The location of the Sapporo Satoland is close to the Moerenuma Park, and food processing facility, event venues, farm, pasture, flower gardens, and park golf ground are located in the area. The free parking lot houses 1,800 vehicles.

The Satoland Centre has a restaurant and meeting rooms, and the Satoland Interchange Hall is a hall designed for events. Visitors can eat organic vegetables grown in Hokkaidō at the restaurant and shops in the building.

The agricultural experience program, including butter, sausage, and ice cream making experiences, has been held at the farm in the park. A bus and carriage run around the park.
