= Sapporo Factory =

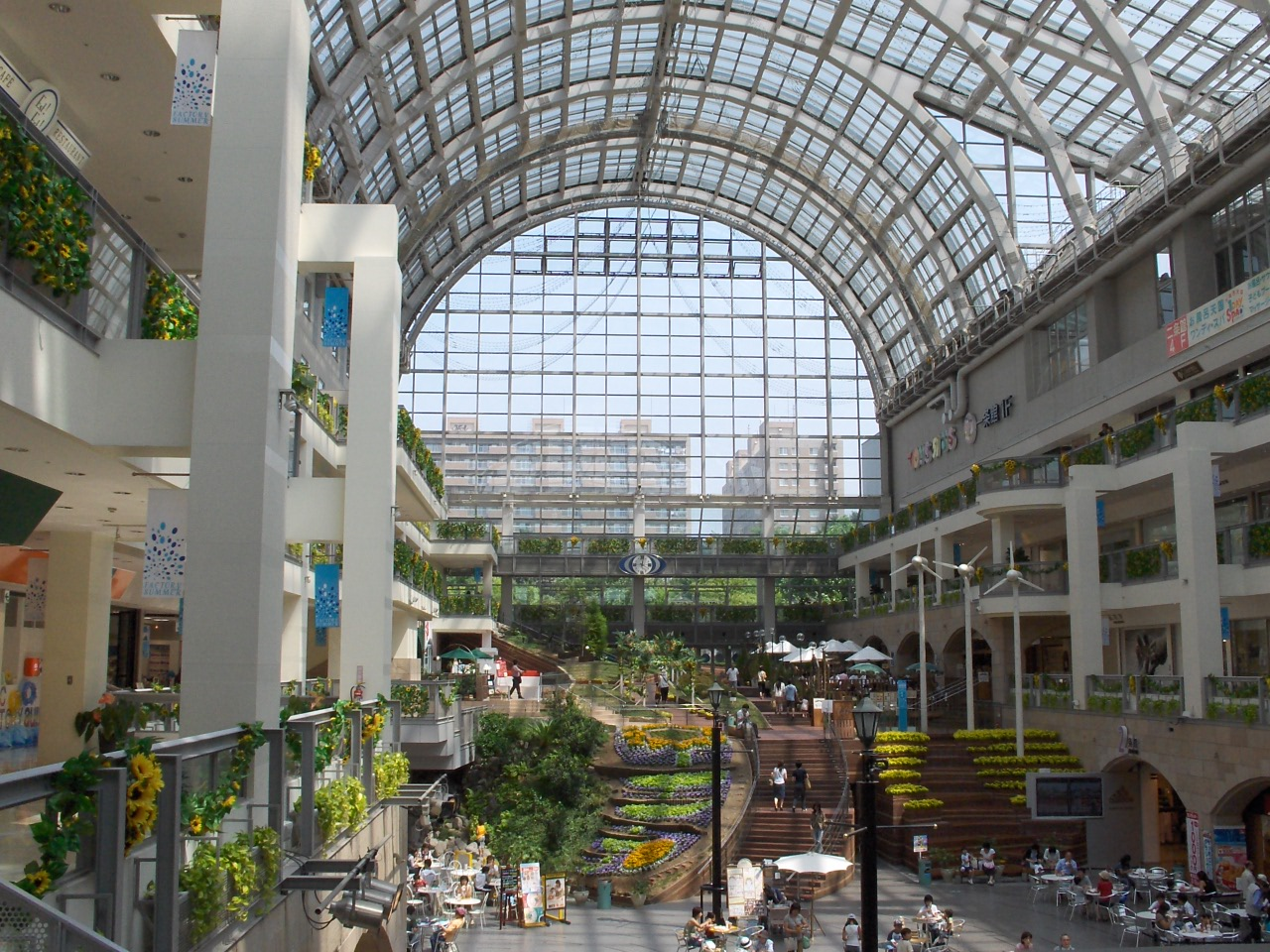
- The Atrium in the Sapporo Factory
- Location: Chūō-ku, Sapporo, Hokkaidō, Japan
- Coordinates: 43°03′56″N 141°21′47″E
- Address: Higashi 4, Kita 2
- Opened: 1993
- Developer: Taisei Corporation
- Manager: Yebisu Garden Place
- Owner: Yebisu Garden Place
- Num. of stores: around 160
- Floor area: 123,322 m^{2} (1,327,430 sq ft)
- Floors: 4 (2 Jō-kan); 9 (Frontier-kan)
- Parking: 1850 vehicles
- Website: www.sapporofactory.jp/index.html(in Japanese)

The Sapporo Factory (サッポロファクトリー, Sapporo Fakutorī) is a complex that includes a shopping mall, office, multiplex movie theaters, and museum, located in Chūō-ku, Sapporo, Hokkaidō, Japan. The building was formerly a brewery that belonged to the Kaitakushi, the old government of Hokkaidō prefecture, and later owned by the Sapporo Beer Company, the predecessor of the Sapporo Brewery. Currently, the Sapporo Factory is run by the Yebisu Garden Place, a subsidiary of Sapporo Holdings Ltd., and a real estate company. The original brewery building was built in 1876, and after the brewery ceased to function in beer production, the operations were moved to a new location in Eniwa, in 1993.

== History ==
In 1875, the former government of Hokkaidō prefecture, Kaitakushi, made a decision to construct a brewery at the official garden in Aoyama, Tokyo, which was created in 1871 and located close to where Aoyama Gakuin University currently sits. The Kaitakushi's original plan was to cultivate imported plants and vegetables in Tokyo and bring them to Hokkaidō; it was thought that imported plants mainly from Europe might not suit the frigid climate in Hokkaidō. Some Kaitakushi officials also contemplated acquiring wide recognition of the modern agricultural technology in Europe and what the Kaitakushi has done, by planting foreign vegetations or introducing expensive farming instruments, and inviting officials and the emperor of Japan to that garden in Aoyama.

Seibei Nakagawa, who had studied the brewing technology in Germany, was appointed chief engineer of the Kaitakushi Brewery in Aoyama, as well as Hisanari Murahashi (born in Kagoshima Prefecture and one of the Satsuma students to travel to England in 1868) as the manager of the official garden. Nakagawa had learned that abundant ice was required to brew beer in the German brewing method, and that led Murahashi to petition the government to change the location of the brewery to Hokkaidō. His petition was approved by the government, and the brewery was planned to be built in Sapporo. On September 23, 1876, the Kaitakushi Brewery was built where the Sapporo factory is currently located. On the inauguration, beer barrels were piled in front of the building. These were eventually restored and are currently placed on the grounds of the Sapporo Beer Museum. The brewery building was made of wood at first, and later enlarged with red brick as the beer made in Sapporo gradually become well known throughout the country.

In 1882, the Kaitakushi was abolished due to financial difficulties, and buildings built by the Kaitakushi were liquidated. In January 1886, the Kaitakushi Brewery belonged to the newly established Hokkaidō Prefectural Government, and later its jurisdiction switched to private ownership. The brewery kept brewing, and the Sapporo Beer Company was established in 1888, with the result that the brewery would be under the control of the company. The brewery was operated until operations were moved to the factory in Eniwa, a city close to Sapporo. After the brewery was moved, plans to preserve the building as a commercial complex were developed, and in 1993, the building was renovated as the Sapporo Factory. The building was constructed by the Taisei Corporation and designed by Minoru Takeyama, an artist who also designed the Shibuya 109 in Tokyo and the Seoul Station in South Korea. On November 2, 2006, the Frontier-kan supermarket was added to the south area.

== Overview ==
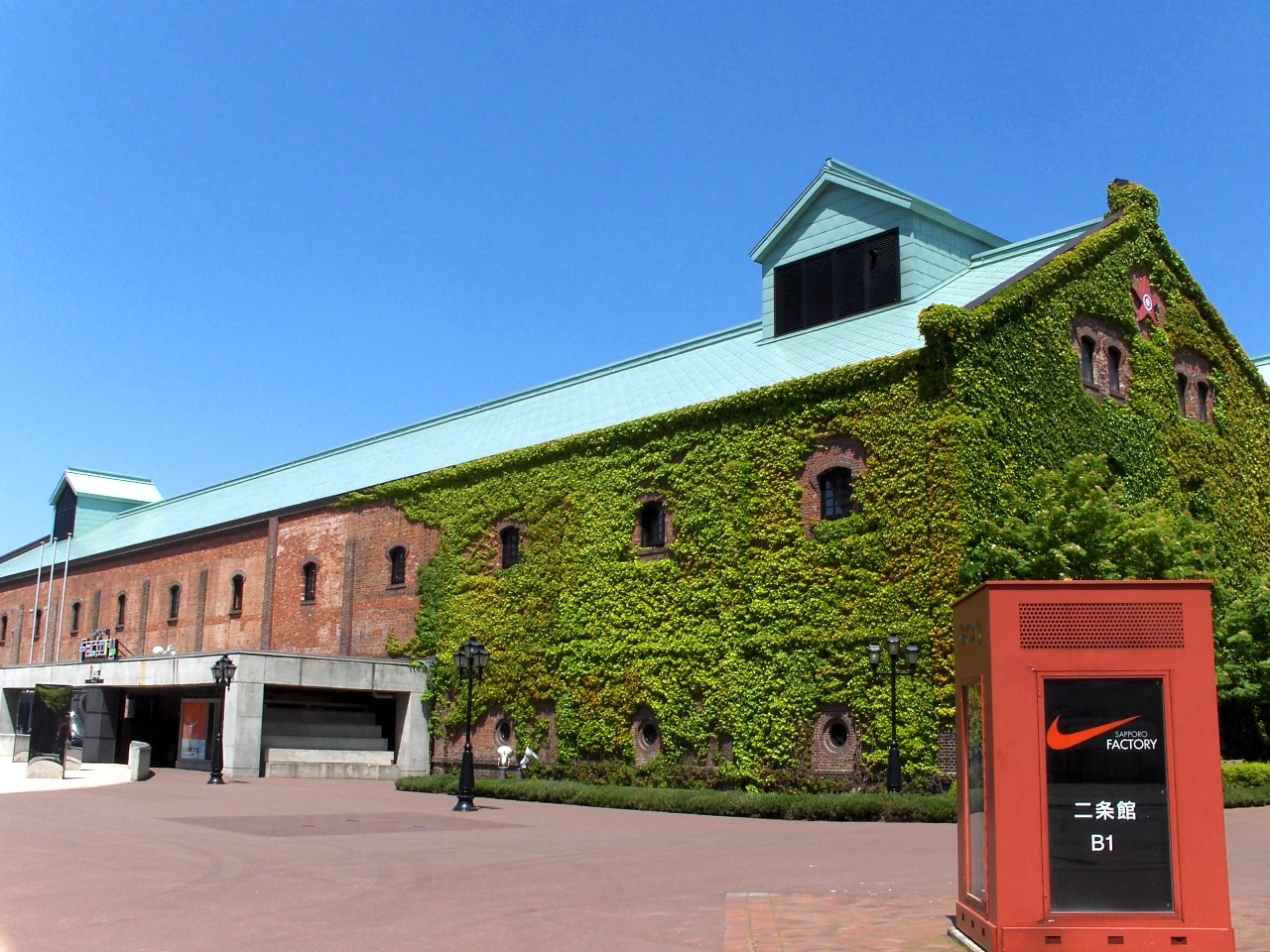
The western side of the Renga-kan

The Sapporo Factory consists of 7 sections: 1 Jō-kan (1st block building), 2 Jō-kan (2nd block building), 3 Jō-kan (3rd block building), the Atrium, Renga-kan (red brick building), Frontier-kan (Frontier building), and Nishi-kan (West building). The buildings of the 2 Jō-kan, 3 Jō-kan and Atrium are combined, and connect to other buildings with access roads. The 2 Jō-kan has 4 stories, and the Frontier-kan has 9 stories, 5 of them are used as the parking lot.

The 1 Jō-kan houses the Toys "R" Us shop and a multiplex called the "United Cinema Sapporo". Most of the clothing, hardware, furniture stores and restaurants in the Sapporo Factory are housed in the 2 Jō-kan, 3 Jō-kan. The 2 Jō-kan also houses the Sapporo Meissen Porcelain Museum at the 4th floor. The Frontier-kan was built most recently in the complex, and the Tokyu department is now located on the ground floor, with office floors in the 3rd and 4th floors.

The Nishi Khan is composed of the Hotel Clubby Sapporo, the Sapporo Factory Fitness Club, and the Sapporo Factory Hall. The hall is a place where many events have been held, it has been the venue for a number of musical events. The Renga-kan houses some restaurants, and the museum of the Kaitakushi Brewery. One of the symbols of the complex, a black colored, tall chimney with the word "Sapporo Beer" on it is standing on the square next to the museum. Open beer gardens are often held in front of the western side of the Renga-kan in summer. In the Atrium, many plants are placed alongside the pathway, and glass windows are fitted into the roof, making the Atrium filled with sunlight during the daytime. A large television is installed on the south side of the Atrium. During Christmas a tall decorated Christmas tree stands at the center. The other sections in the complex are also decorated with lights during Christmas.

== Transportation ==
The closest station from Sapporo Factory would be Basusentamae station, or if you walk a little more, it will be Ōdōri Station. From Basusentamae, It takes about 5minutes from the station to Sapporo Factory. Both Basusentamae and Odori Station runs through the Tozai line in which you can also remember it as the orange line in the Sapporo underground subway. For Odori Station, Odori Station runs through Tozai line, Namboku line, and Tohou line. From the Basusentamae station to Sapporo Factory, because that there are not much distance, not many shops or restaurants are seen between the two places.
