= Sapporo Snow Festival =

Annual festival in Hokkaido, Japan

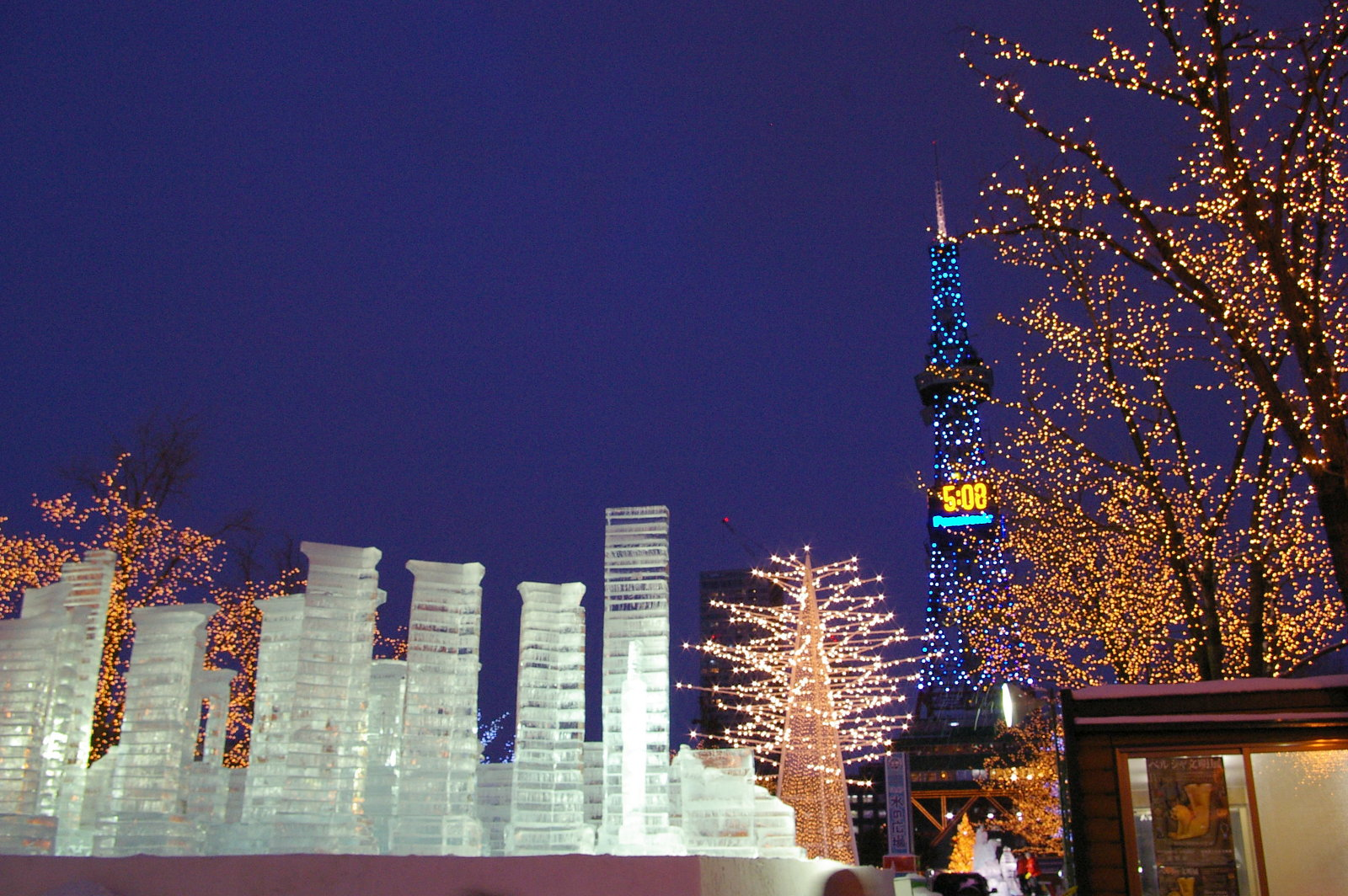
- Central Sapporo, 2007
- Genre: Snow Festival
- Dates: February
- Locations: Sapporo, Japan
- Years active: 1950–present
- Website: Sapporo Snow Festival

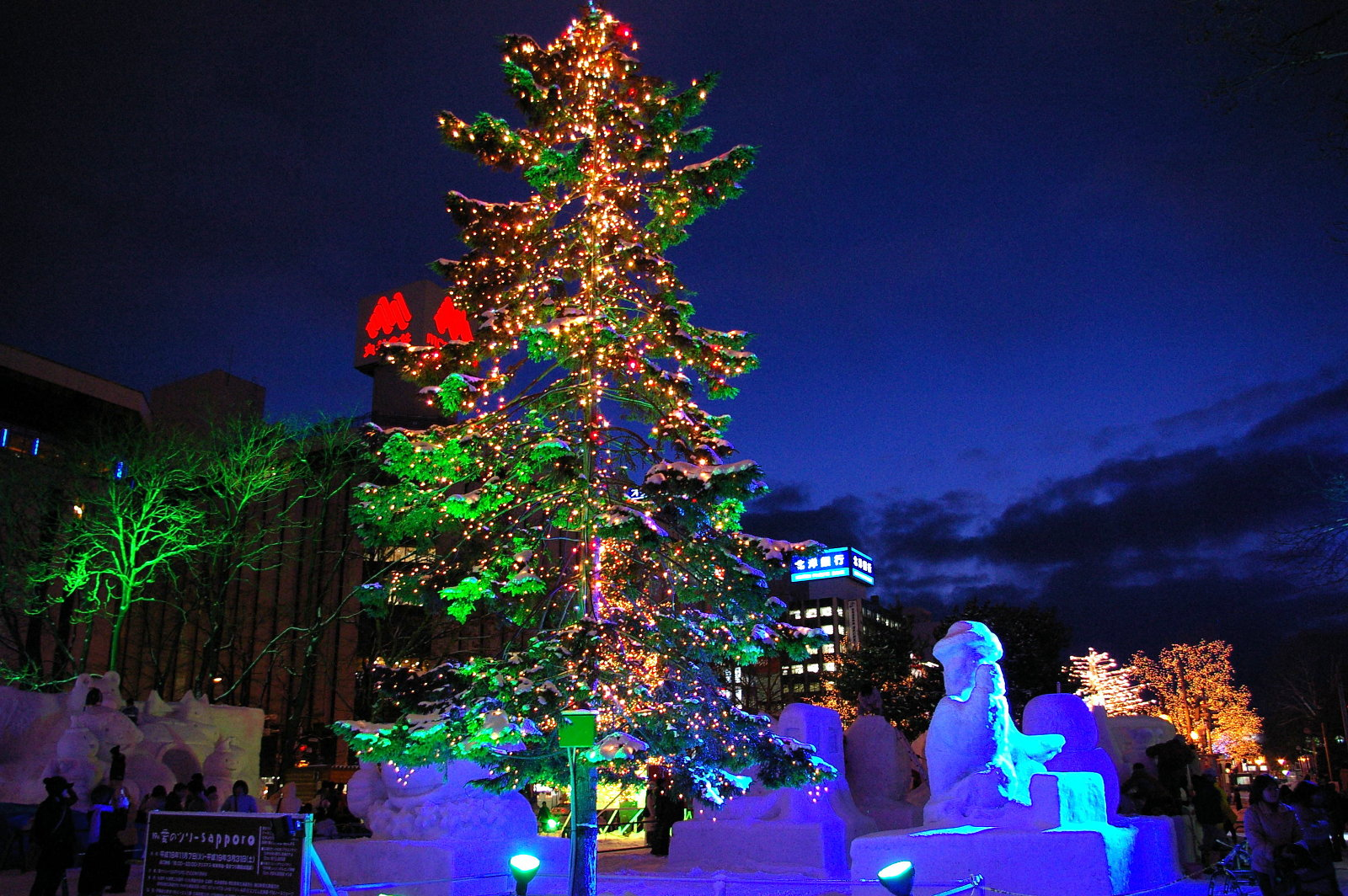

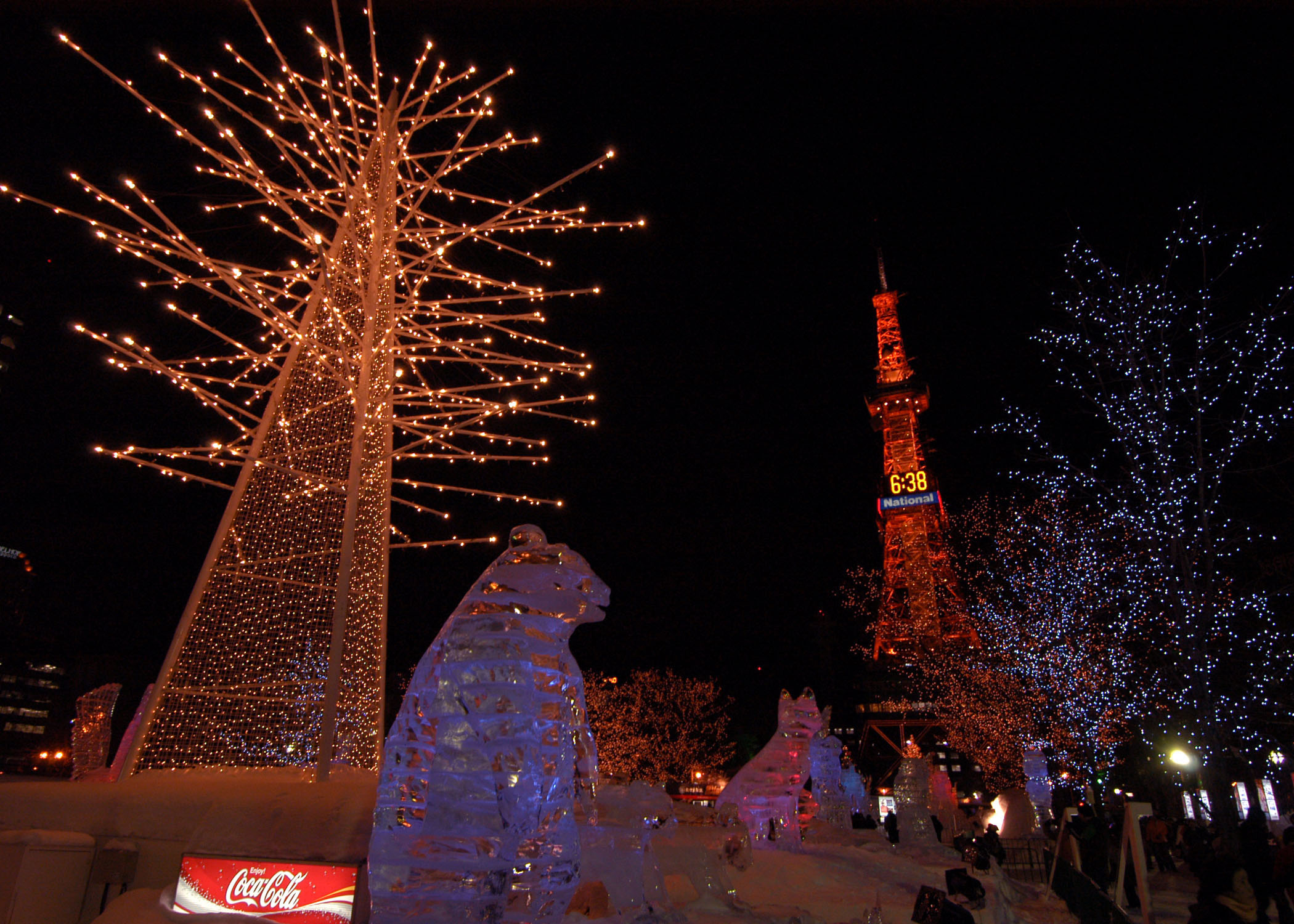

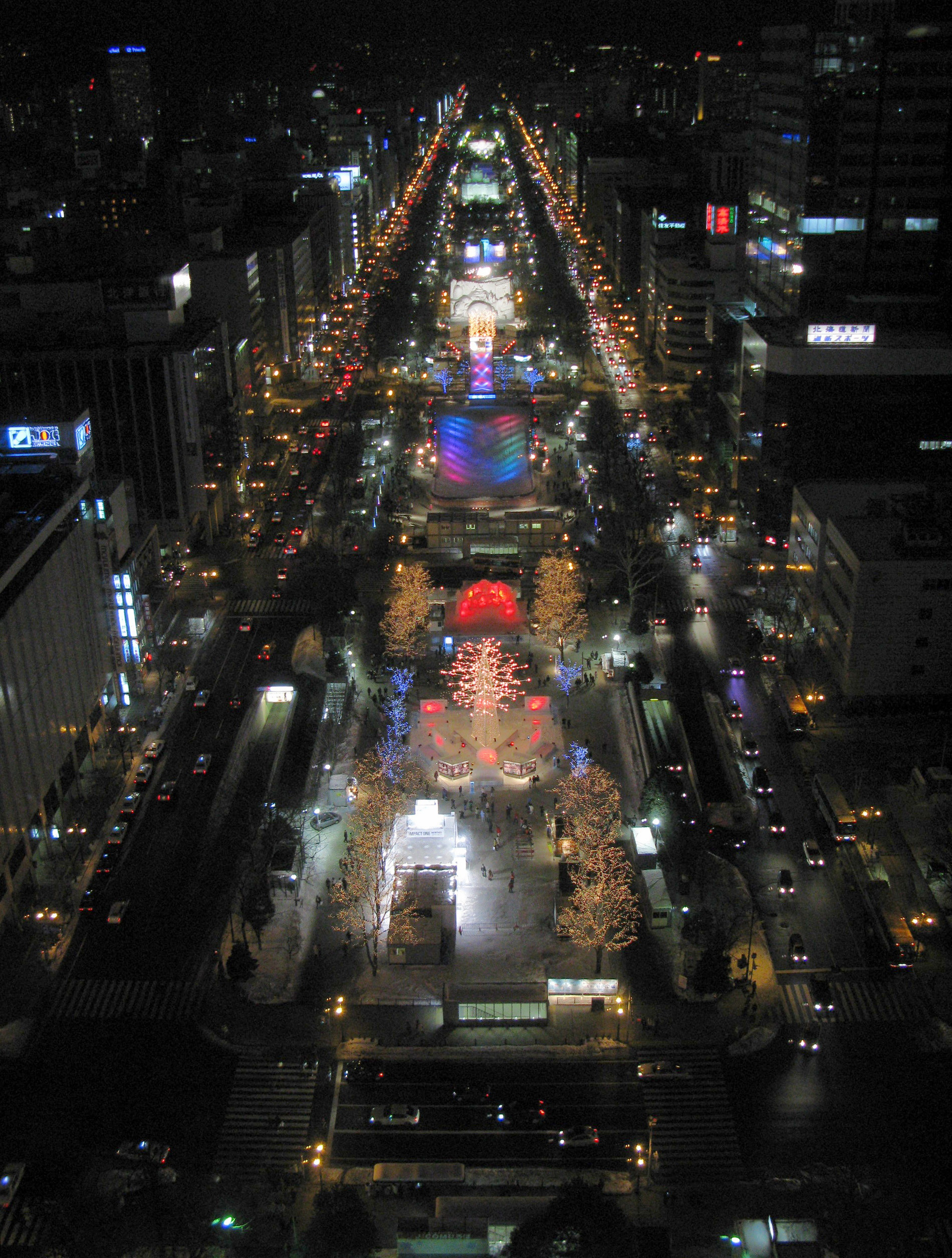

The Sapporo Snow Festival (札幌雪祭り, Sapporo Yuki-matsuri) is a festival held annually in Sapporo, Japan, over seven days in February. Odori Park, Susukino, and Tsudome are the main sites of the festival.

In 2007 (57th festival), about two million people visited Sapporo to see the hundreds of snow statues and ice sculptures at the Odori Park and Susukino sites, in central Sapporo, and at the Satoland site. An International Snow Sculpture Contest has been held at the Odori Park site since 1974, and 14 teams from various regions of the world participated in 2008.

The subject of the statues varies and often features an event, famous building or person from the previous year. For example, in 2004, there were statues of Hideki Matsui, the famous baseball player who at that time played for the New York Yankees. A number of stages made out of snow are also constructed and some events including musical performances are held. At the Satoland site, visitors can enjoy the long snow and ice slides as well as a huge maze made of snow. Visitors can also enjoy a variety of regional foods from all over Hokkaidō at the Odori Park and Satoland sites, such as fresh seafood, potatoes, corn, and fresh dairy products.

Every year the number of statues displayed is around 400 in total. In 2007, there were 307 statues created at the Odori Park site, 32 at the Satoland site and 100 at the Susukino site. A good view of the creations can be seen from the TV Tower at the Odori Park site.

== History ==
The Snow Festival began as a one-day event in 1950, when six local high school students built six snow statues in Odori Park. In 1955 the Japan Self-Defense Forces from the nearby Makomanai base joined in and built the first massive snow sculptures, for which the Snow Festival has now become famous. Several snow festivals existed in Sapporo prior to the Sapporo Snow Festival, however, all of these were suspended during World War II.

On 4 February 1966, a flight from Sapporo to Tokyo crashed into Tokyo Bay killing all 126 passengers and 7 crew on board. Many of the passengers were returning to Tokyo after visiting the snow festival.

Owing to the Energy crisis of 1974, snow statues were built using drums. This was due to the shortage of gasoline caused by the crisis and unavailability of trucks used to transport snow to the site. In the same year, the International Snow Statue Competition started and since that year many snow statues built by teams from other countries have featured; especially from sister cities of Sapporo such as Munich.

In years when the accumulated snowfall is low, the Self-Defense Force, for whom participation is considered a training exercise, brings in snow from outside Sapporo. The Makomanai base, one of three main sites from 1965, hosted the largest sculptures, with an emphasis on providing play space for children. Use of the Makomanai site was suspended in 2005 and moved to the Sapporo Satoland site located in Higashi-ku from 2006. In 2009, the Satoland site was moved to the Tsudome (つどーむ, Tsudōmu; Sapporo Community Dome) site. The Tsudome, located close to the Sapporo Satoland, is a dome for multiple sports events.

Nakajima Park was established as one of the festival sites in 1990. However, it was removed as a site in 1992. The third site, known as the Susukino Ice Festival (すすきの氷の祭典, Susukino Kōri no Saiten), is situated in the night-life district of Susukino and includes predominantly ice carvings. The site was approved as one of the festival sites in 1983. Every year, the Susukino Queen of Ice, a female beauty contest, is held at the site.

On 7 February 2012 (63rd Festival), a snow sculpture of Snow Miku (a winter-themed Hatsune Miku character) collapsed on the Odori Park 6th Venue, where a female tourist was injured. This accident was the first injury in the history of the Snow Festival from the collapse of a snow sculpture. The collapse was likely due to imbalance caused by disproportionately thin supporting legs to the main mass of the sculpture. Additionally, the temperature on February 6 was 3.3 degrees Celsius, and the temperature on 7th was 2.2 degrees Celsius, likely causing it to become brittle and more prone to collapse. In response to this, the executive committee demolished all or part of the heavy snow sculptures and ten civilian snow sculptures as there was a risk of collapse.

== See also ==
- Winter festival
