= Sapporo TV Tower =

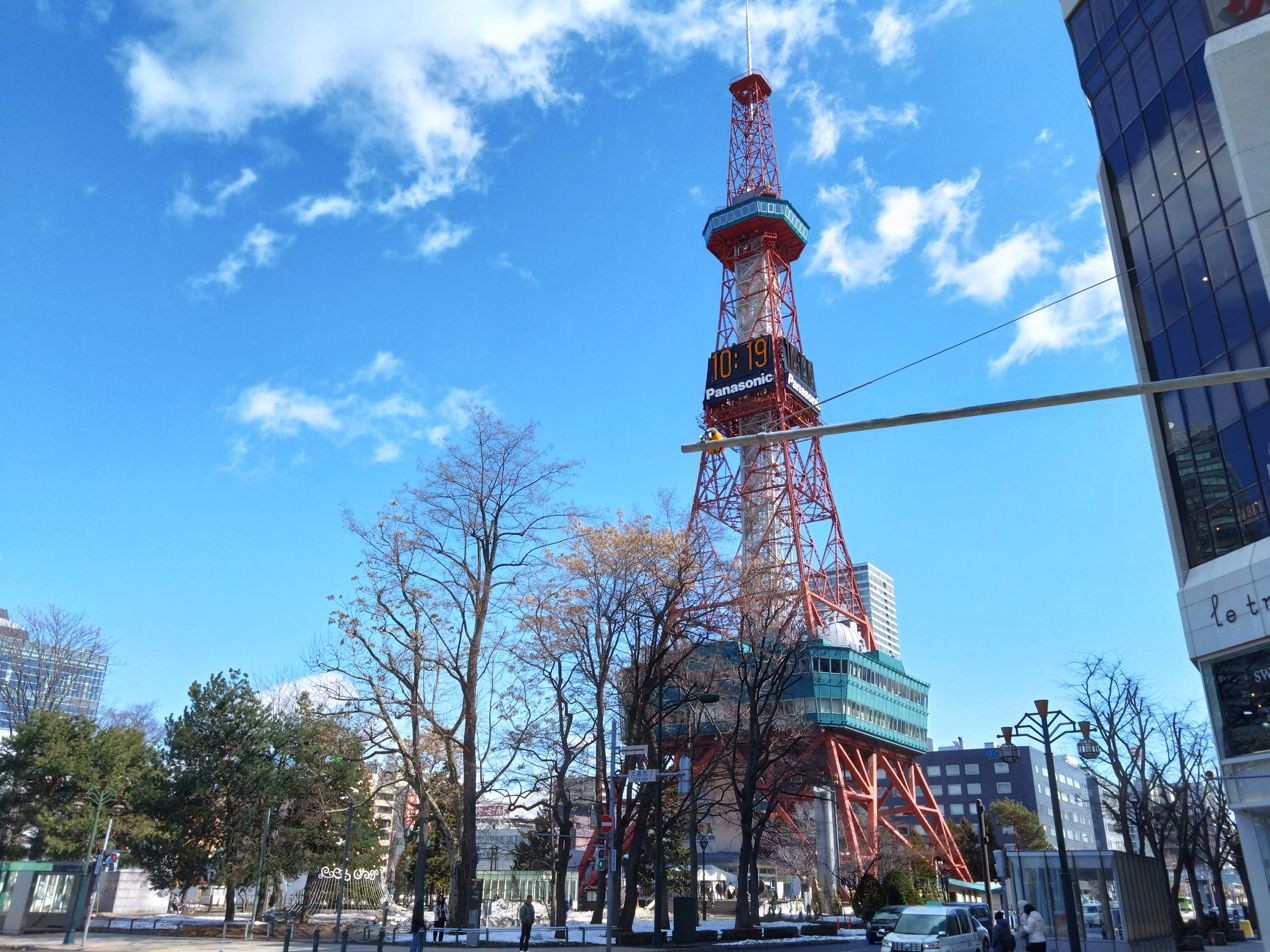
- Sapporo TV Tower

- Location within Japan Location within Hokkaido Location within Sapporo
- Interactive map of the Sapporo TV Tower area

General information
- Status: Completed
- Location: Chūō-ku, Sapporo, Hokkaido, Japan
- Coordinates: 43°03′40″N 141°21′23″E
- Opening: August 24, 1957; 69 years ago

Height
- Antenna spire: 147.2 m (483 ft)

Technical details
- Floor count: 5
- Lifts/elevators: 2

Design and construction
- Architect: Tachū Naitō

The Sapporo TV Tower (Japanese: さっぽろテレビ塔, Hepburn: Sapporo Terebi-tō), built in 1957, is a 147.2-metre-high (483 ft) TV tower with an observation deck at a height of 90.38 metres. Located on the ground of Odori Park, in the northern city of Sapporo, Hokkaido, Japan, the tower is open to tourists.

== History ==
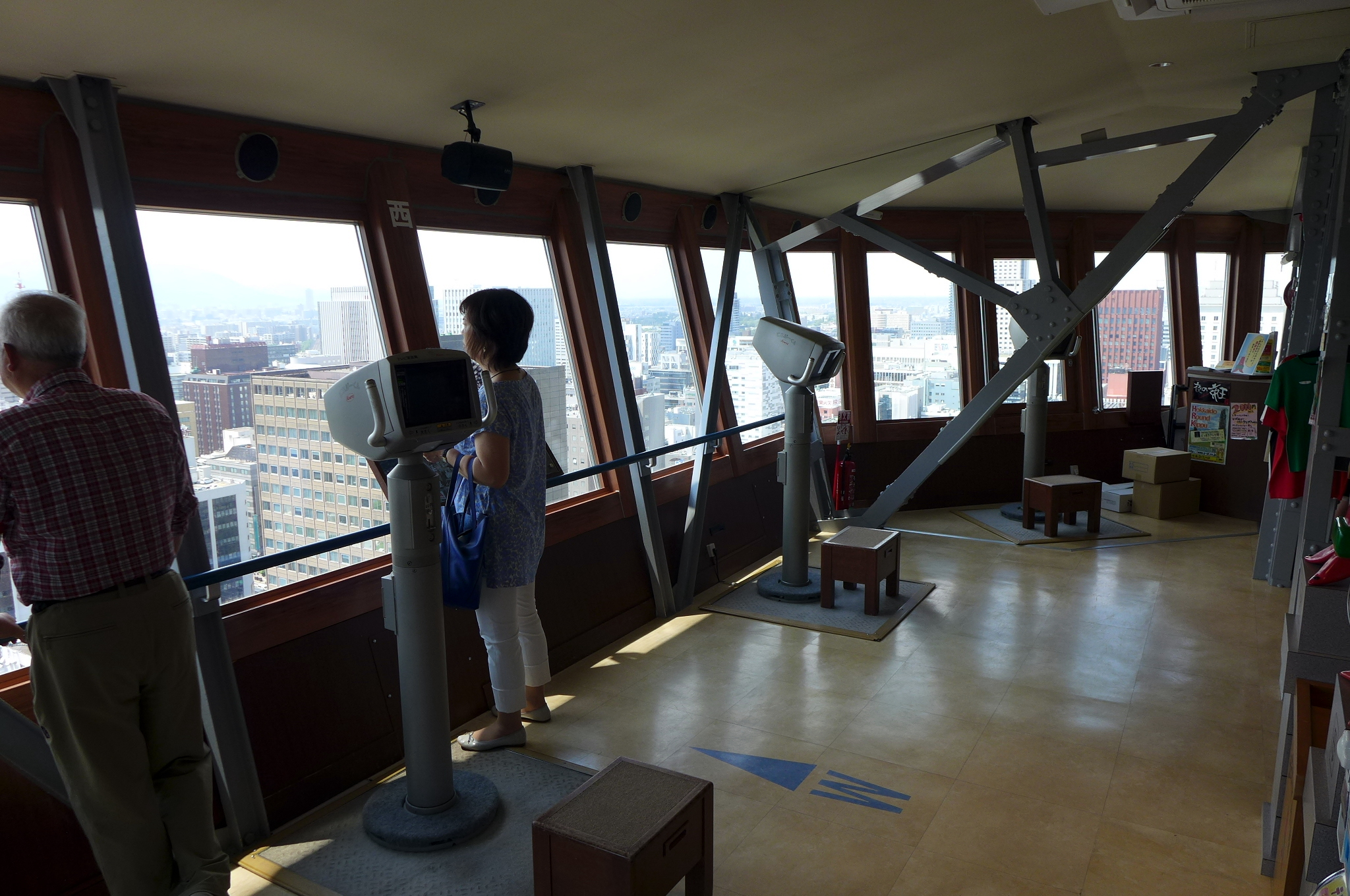
Observation deck of the tower

The TV Tower was built in 1957 by Tachū Naitō, a Japanese architect who is famous for planning the Tokyo Tower, with the total construction costs of 170 million yen. Since the transmission facility was established on the Mount Teine, The Sapporo TV Tower has worked as a repeater of AIR-G and FM North Wave, a radio station based in Sapporo.

In 1961, digital clocks were installed at the height of 65 metres from the ground, which were donated by Matsushita Electric Industrial Co., a Japanese electronics manufacturer. This installation was suggested by the founder of the company Konosuke Matsushita, who thought that these digital clocks would draw a great attention to the Tower. These digital clocks, installed at four sides of the Tower, have been repaired two times: in 1998 and 2006. The interior and exterior of the Sapporo TV Tower were renovated in 2002, and the color of walls at the second and third floors were then changed from pale green to dark green. In the second repair of the digital clocks in 2006, the light-emitting diode was adopted, and the advertisement right below the clocks was changed from the "National" to "Panasonic".

The Sapporo TV Tower commemorated its 50th anniversary in 2007, and some events and a discount campaign were held. In 2007, a replacement tower with a height of 650 metres was proposed. In the plan, the area of the new tower was to be 7800 m², including hotel rooms, offices, sports facilities, and an observation deck at a height of 500 metres.

Sapporo TV Tower on a sunny day, 2016

== Outline ==
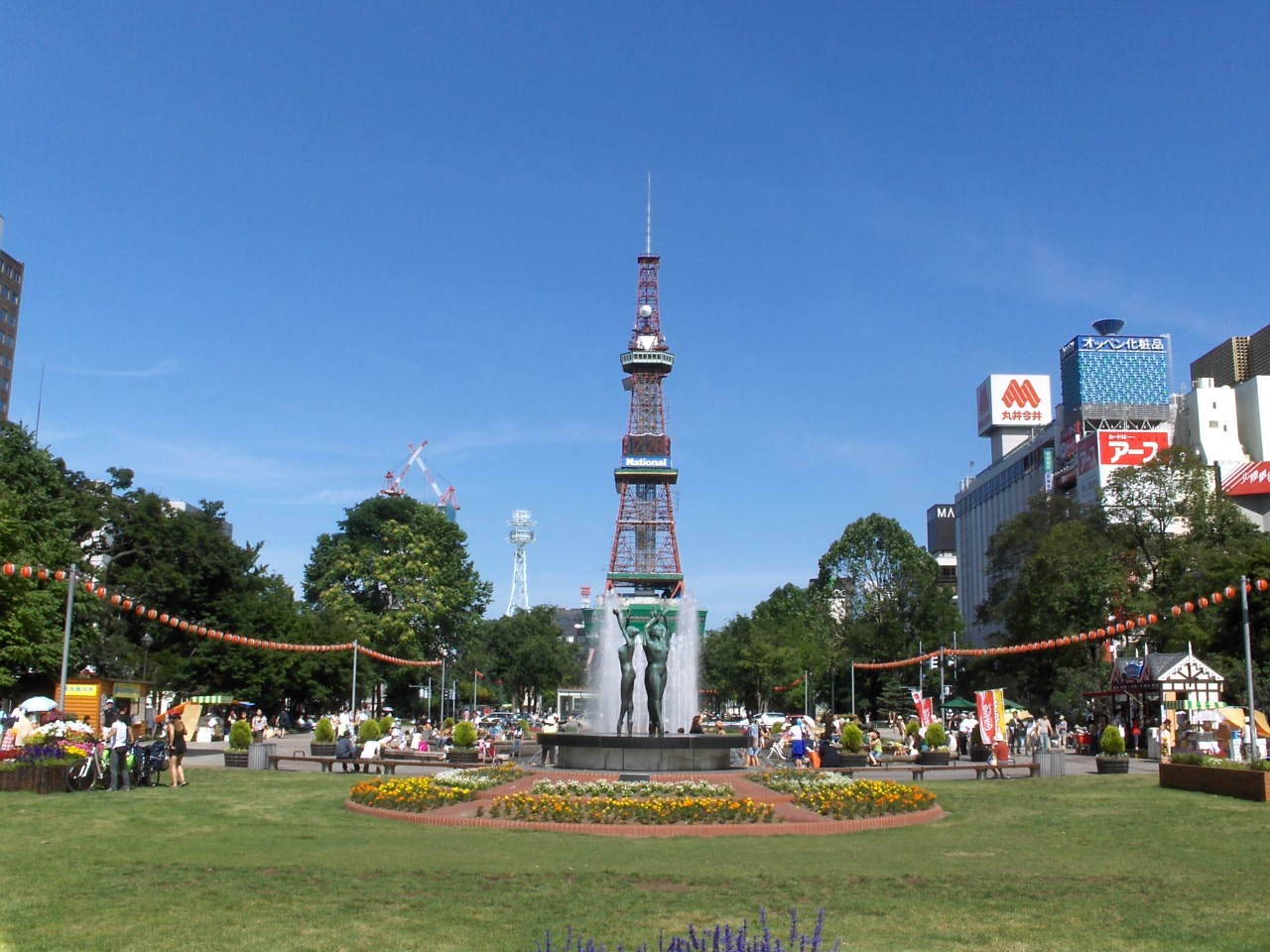
A view of the tower from the Odori Park

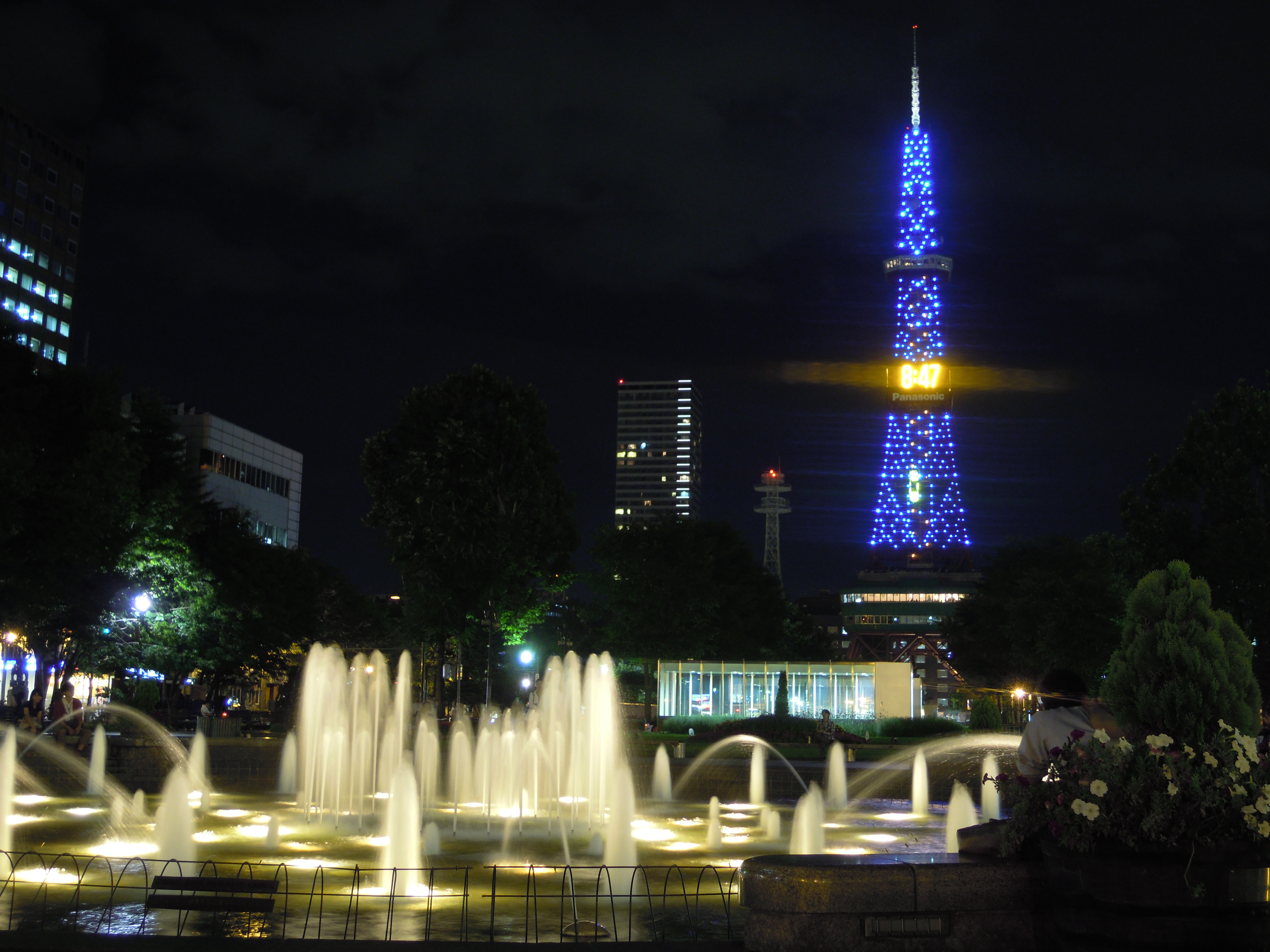
A view of the tower from the Odori Park

The ground floor of the Sapporo TV Tower houses an information center and stores. The multipurpose hall and administration office of the Tower are placed on the second floor, and a souvenir shop and restaurant are located on the third floor. The basement connects to the Aurora Town, an underground shopping arcade, and a number of restaurants called the "Tele-chika Gourmet Court" are located.

The official mascot of the Tower is "Tawakkie", and the unofficial character "Terebi-Tōsan" (Television Daddy) is also known.

The lift to the observation deck at 90 metres high is located on the third floor, where visitors are required to buy tickets to continue to the observation deck. From the observation deck, the entire view of the Odori Park, Mount Ōkura, and Maruyama are seen. Having the height of 147.2 metres, the Sapporo TV Tower used to be the most prominent figure in Sapporo, but recently many high-rise buildings have been constructed around the Odori Park, making the Tower less prominent.

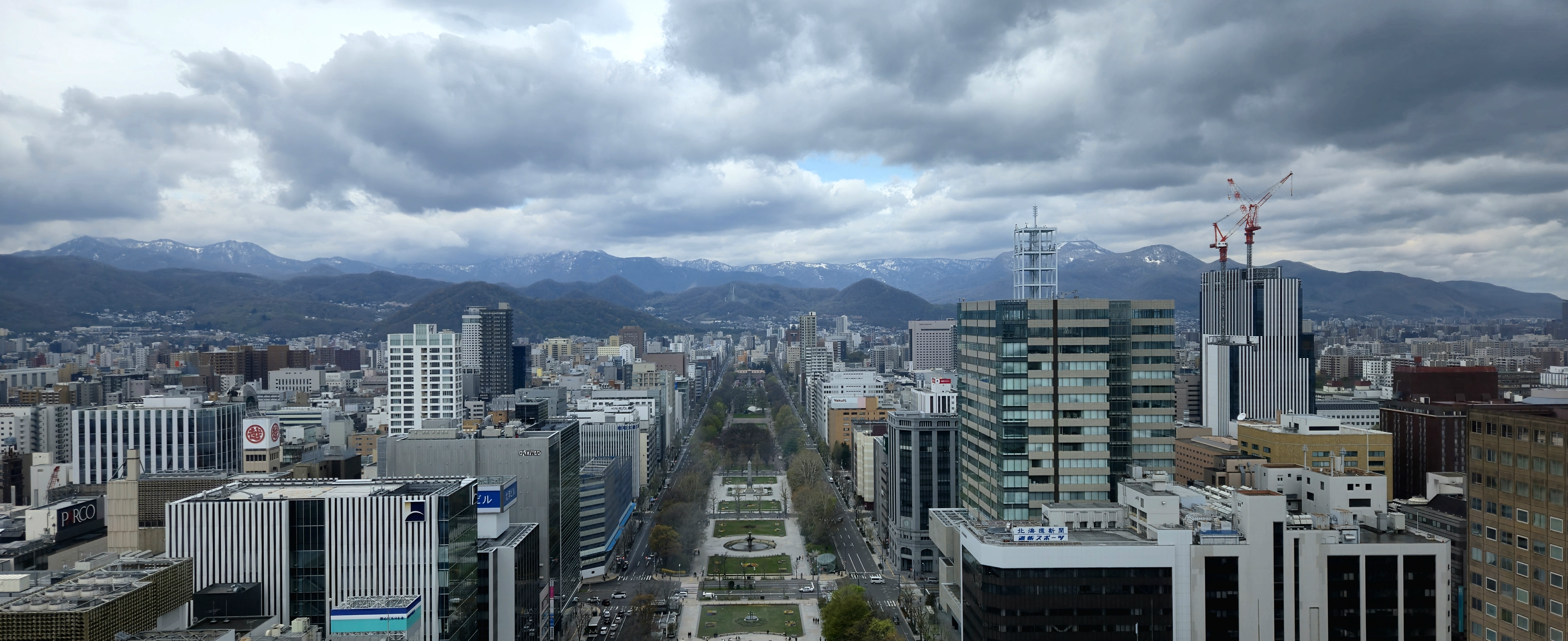
View of Odori Park and the surrounding city from the observation deck

== Appearances in popular culture ==
- Food Wars!: Shokugeki no Soma
- Godzilla vs. King Ghidorah
- Godzilla vs. SpaceGodzilla
- Gamera 2: Attack of Legion
- Higehiro
- Monster X Strikes Back: Attack the G8 Summit
- Yakuza 5
- Persona 5: Scramble
- Wave, Listen to Me!
- Marmalade Boy
- Kita Kita
