= Sapporo Otani Junior College =

Coordinates: 43°4′54.8″N 141°21′59.3″E

- 札幌大谷大学短期大学部
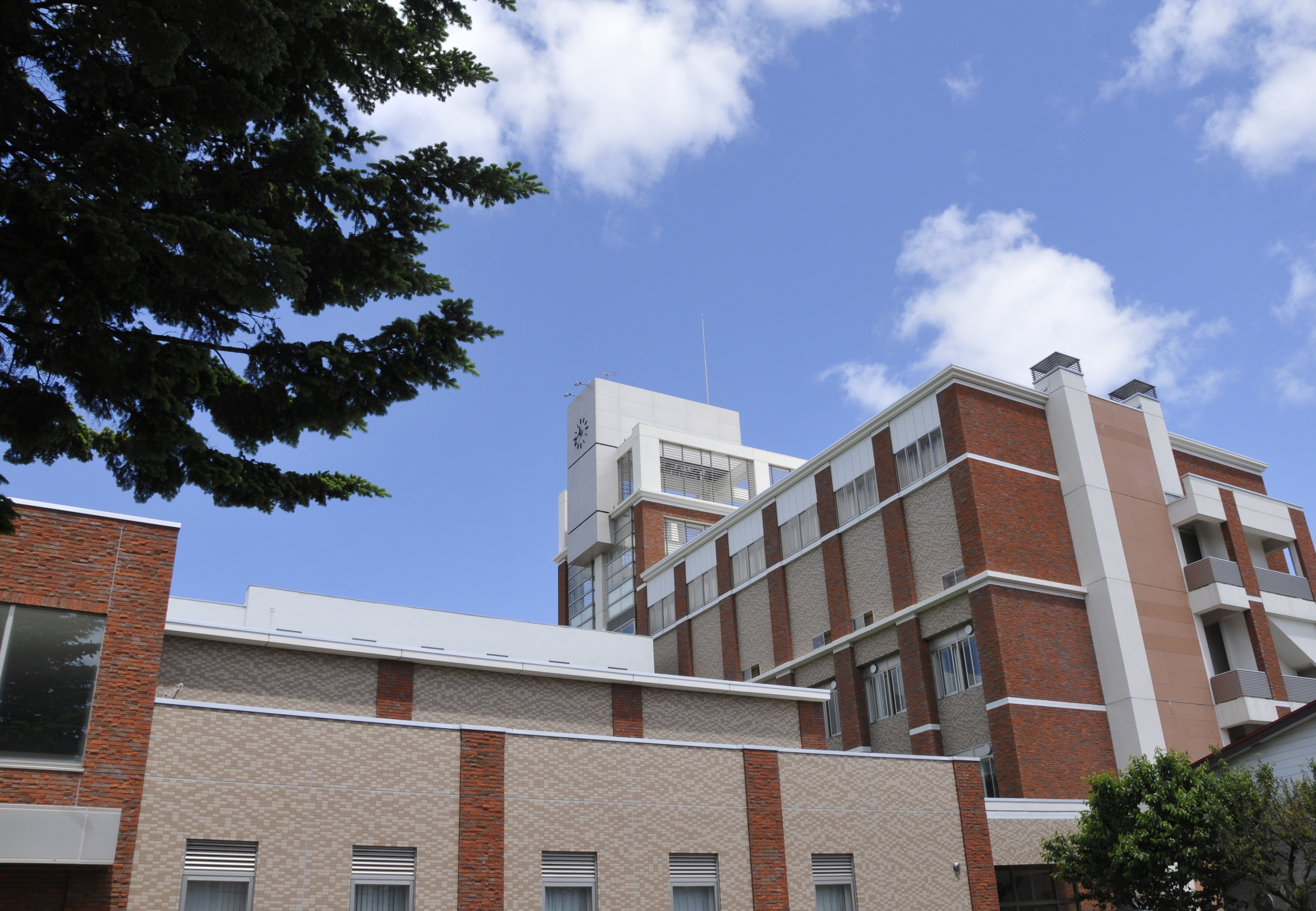
- Type: Private
- Established: 1961
- Location: Higashi-ku, Sapporo, Japan
- Website: http://www.sapporo-otani.ac.jp/gakubu/hoikuka/index.php

Sapporo Otani Junior College (札幌大谷大学短期大学部, Sapporo Otani Daigaku Tanki daigakubu) is a private junior college in Higashi-ku, Sapporo, Japan, established in 1961.

== Academic departments ==
- Academic departments of Childcare.
- Academic departments of Fine Art studies.
- Academic departments of Music studies.

== See also ==
- List of junior colleges in Japan
