= Sapporo Community Dome =

Multi-purpose hall in Higashi-ku, Hokkaido, Japan

- Tsudome
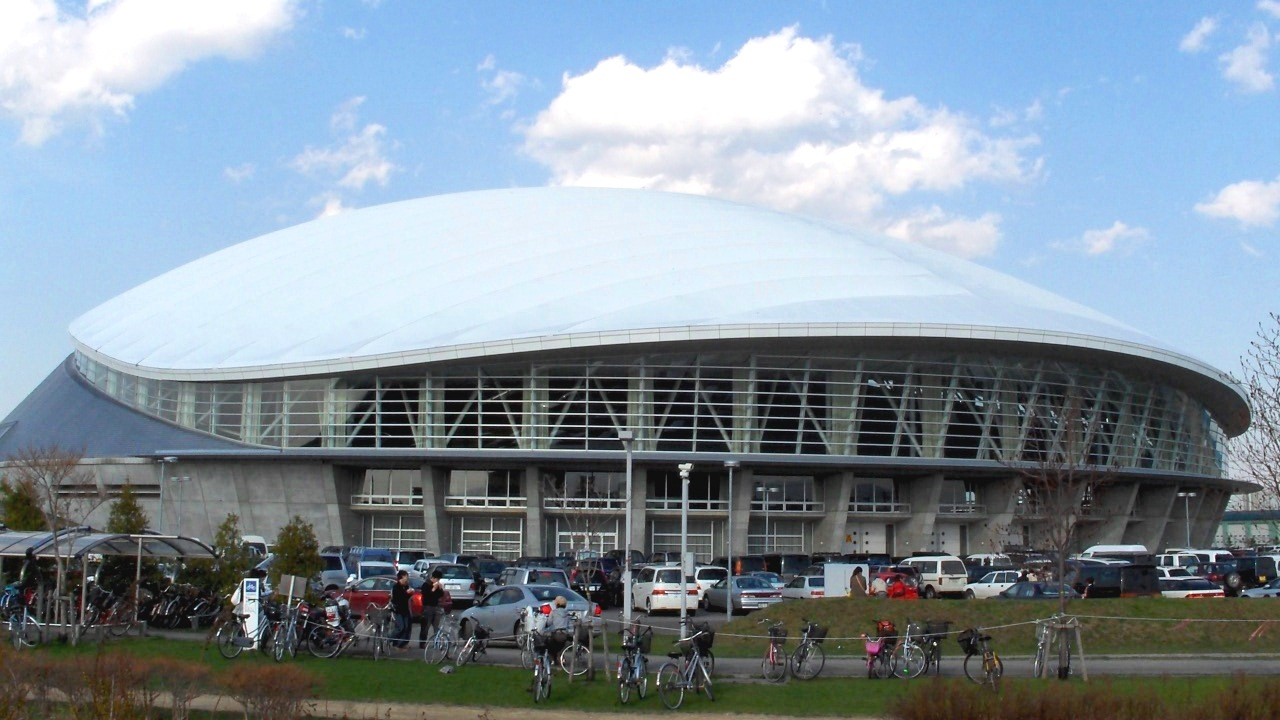
- Interactive map of Sapporo Community Dome
- Full name: Sapporo Community Dome
- Location: Sakae-machi 885-1, Higashi-ku, Sapporo, Hokkaidō, Japan
- Coordinates: 43.115849°N 141.375134°E
- Owner: Sapporo City
- Field size: diameter 132.4 m height 43 m building area 17,865 m^{2}

Construction
- Built: May, 1997
- Opened: 15 June 1997
- Project manager: Sapporo Health Sports Foundation
- General contractor: Taisei Construction et al.

Sapporo Community Dome (札幌コミュニティドーム), widely known for its nickname "Tsudome" (つどーむ), is a multi-purpose hall located in Higashi-ku, Sapporo, Hokkaidō, Japan. Owned by Sapporo city, the dome is run by the Sapporo Health Sports Foundation.

== Overview ==
The dome is 132.4 m in diameter, 43 m in height, and has an area of 17,865 m^{2}. The dome is located on the outskirts of central Sapporo city, and is near Sakaemachi Station, which is on the Tōhō Line of the Sapporo Municipal Subway. The dome also has a park golf course, tennis court, and parking lot.

Along with a number of sporting events including marathons, basketball, and football competitions, the dome holds other events such as the Golden Market, which is the biggest flea market in Sapporo and is held annually at the dome.

2009 marked the 60th anniversary of the Sapporo Snow Festival, and in this year the second venue of the festival was moved from the Sapporo Satoland site to the Tsudome site. This transference of the sites was done to reduce the parking lot costs by restricting a large number of cars visiting from the site and to help alleviate traffic congestion. Although the parking lot has a capacity of 306 cars, the Tsudome site did not allow parking for cars and asked visitors to use public transportation to reach the Tsudome site during the Festival this year.

== See also ==
- Higashi-ku, Sapporo
- Sapporo Dome
- Sapporo Satoland
- Sapporo Snow Festival
