= Sapporo Ōtani University =

Educational institution in Japan

Coordinates: 43.082038°N 141.365204°E

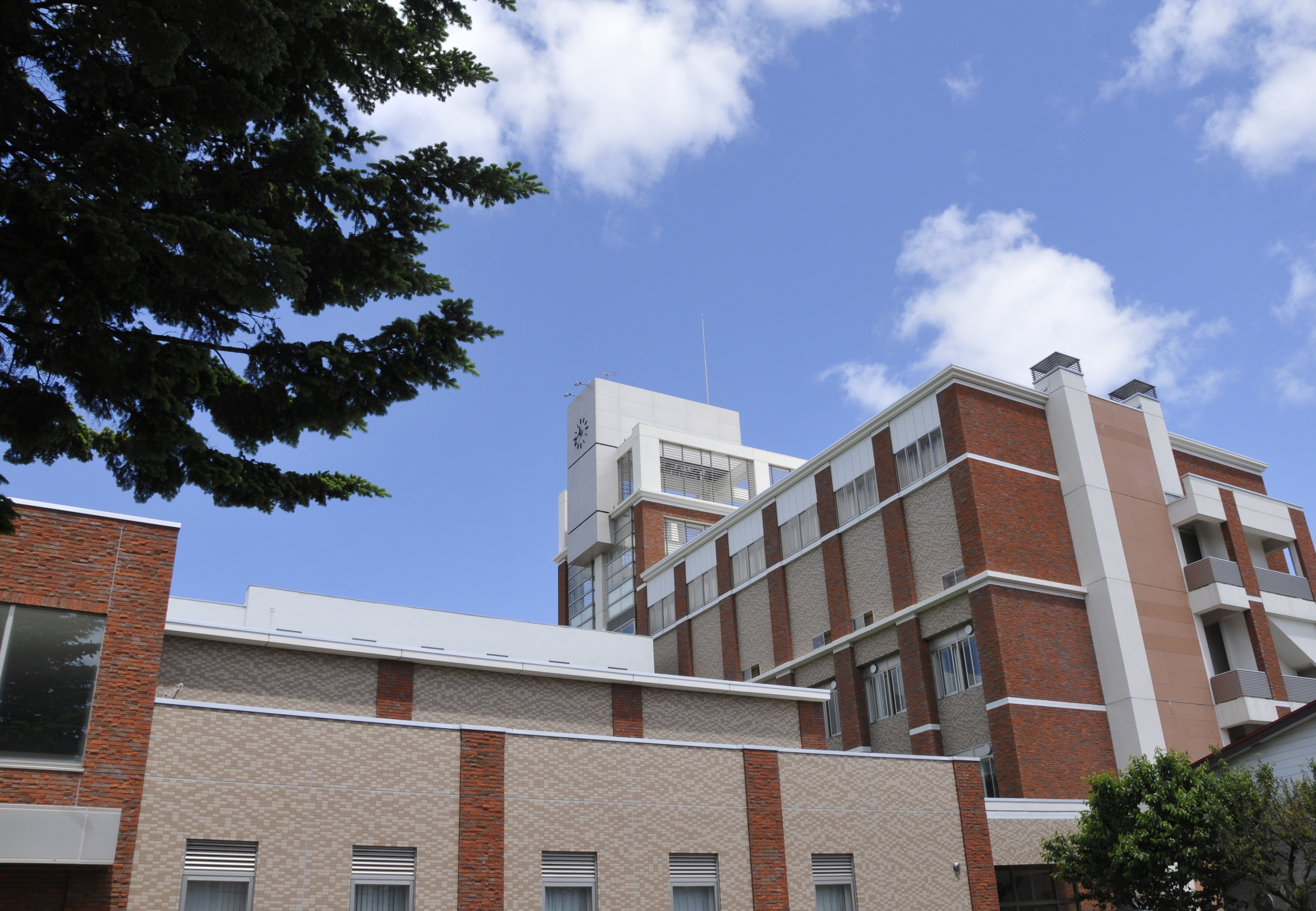
Sapporo Ōtani University

Sapporo Ōtani University (札幌大谷大学, Sapporo-ōtani-daigaku) is a private university in Higashi-ku, Sapporo Hokkaidō, Japan, established in 2006. The predecessor of the school was founded in 1906.

== Faculties ==
- Art (Fine Arts / Music)
- Sociology

== History ==
Sapporo Otani University (Otani for short) was founded in 1906 as Private Hokkai Girls School (私立北海女学校, Siritu Hokkai Jo Gakko) by Eisei Kiyokawa.

In 1910, Private Hokkai Girls High School (私立北海高等女学校, Siritsu Hokkai Koutou Jo Gakkou) renewed.
