= Sapporo Beer Museum =

Coordinates: 43°04′17″N 141°22′08″E

Sapporo Beer Museum サッポロビール博物館
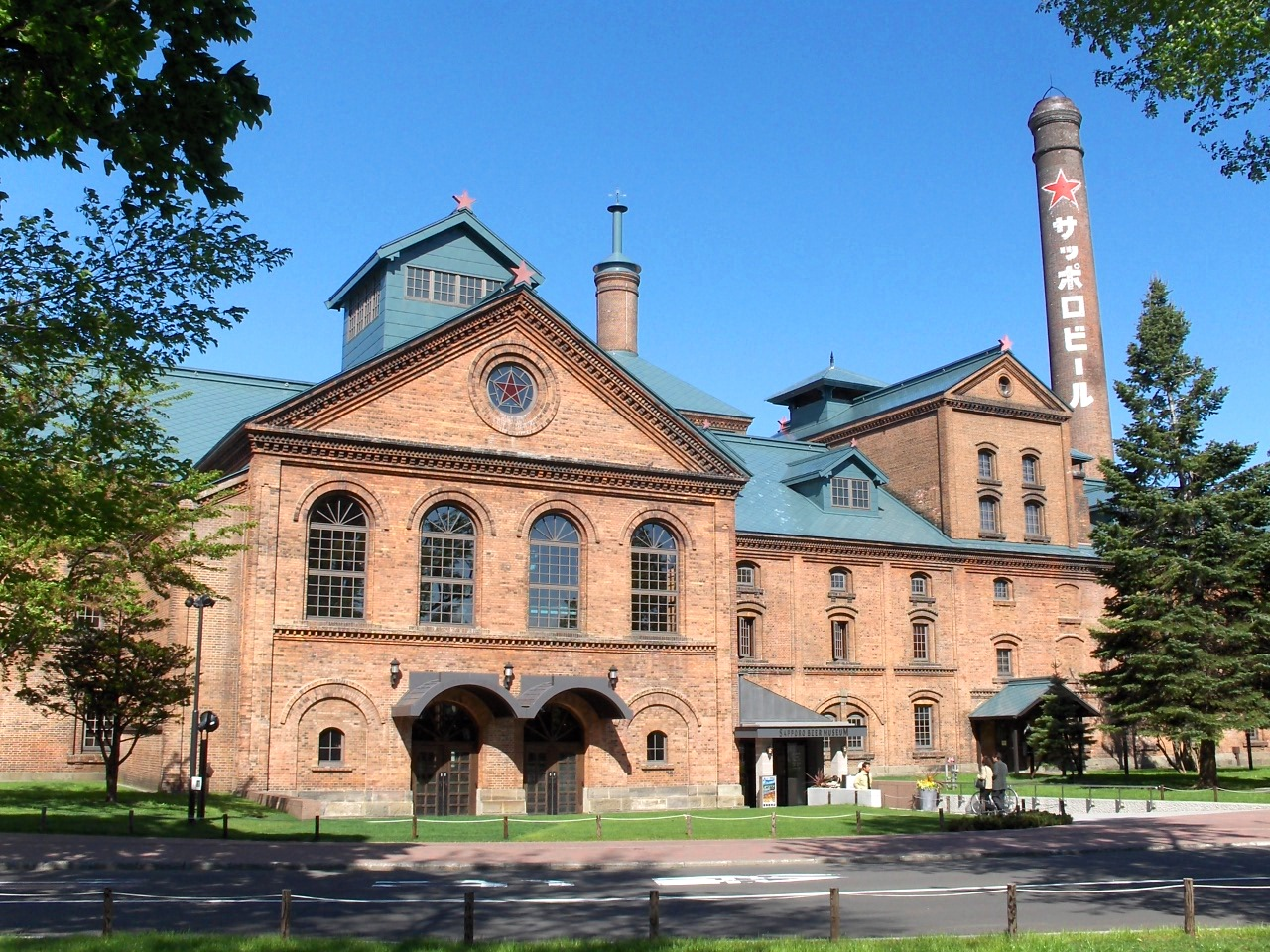
- Established: 1890 (as a factory); 1987 (as a museum)
- Location: Higashi-ku, Sapporo, Hokkaidō, Japan
- Type: Beer museum
- Visitors: 143,900 (2006)
- Director: Sapporo Breweries Limited
- Curator: Sapporo Breweries Limited
- Website: Sapporo Beer Museum

The Sapporo Beer Museum (サッポロビール博物館, Sapporo Bīru Hakubutsukan) is a museum located in the Sapporo Garden Park in Higashi-ku, Sapporo, Hokkaidō, Japan. Registered as one of the Hokkaidō Heritage sites in 2004, the museum is the only beer museum in Japan. The red-brick building was erected originally as a factory of the Sapporo Sugar Company in 1890, and later opened as a museum in July 1987. The building also houses the Sapporo Beer Garden in the south wing.

== History ==
The history of the Sapporo Beer Museum dates back to Meiji period, when William Smith Clark, who visited Hokkaidō as an O-yatoi gaikokujin, started beer production, and the Hokkaidō Kaitaku-shi, the former government of Hokkaidō, established a number of breweries in Sapporo. William Clark was a president of the Massachusetts Agricultural College, which had one of the best techniques of beet production in the United States at that time, and he hoped to establish the beet cultivation in Hokkaidō during his stay. After Clark went back to the United States, the Kaitaku-shi began beet production in Nanae Village, where is currently a part of Hakodate. This was the first beet cultivation in Hokkaidō.

In 1878, the Kaitaku-shi delegated beet cultivation to the Sapporo Agricultural College, the predecessor of the Hokkaidō University, and a Monbetsu Sugar Factory was built in 1879, where currently Date is located. The sugar factory was disposed to the private, and in 1888, the Sapporo Sugar Company was established with a sugar manufacturing factory in Naebo Village, which would have been Naebo area in Higashi-ku, Sapporo. The company was established as a manufacturer of beet sugar, and asked foreign engineers for advice. The factory building of the Sapporo Sugar Company later became the Sapporo Beer Museum and the Sapporo Beer Garden. The construction of the building was supervised by the government of Hokkaidō, and a Germany-based company the Sangerhausen.

While the sugar manufacturing building was constructed, the Kaitaku-shi Brewery was established on September 23, 1876, in the place where now the Sapporo Factory is located. It was built by the government official Murahashi Hisanari. The chief engineer of the brewery was Seibei Nakagawa, who learned brewing technique in Germany. The inauguration was held at the brewery, and beer barrels were piled up in front of the building. These barrels were restored, and currently located in the area of the Sapporo Beer Museum.

The Kaitaku-shi Brewery was disposed, and the Sapporo Beer Company was established in December 1887, which later became the Sapporo Brewery. Due to the popularization of Taiwanese sugar manufacturers after the end of First Sino-Japanese War in 1895, Japanese sugar manufacture declined, causing liquidation of the beet manufacturing factory run by the Sapporo Sugar Company. In 1903, the Sapporo Beer Company purchased and remodeled the factory to use as a brewery.

The factory was operated until 1965, and the Kaitaku-shi Beer Memorial Hall was constructed at the third floor of the building in 1967, which exhibited a number of historical records, tools, and documents practically used in the factory. After the renovation of the building, the Sapporo Beer Museum was officially opened to the public in July 1987. After the function of the factory as a brewery transferred to Eniwa, the building was renovated again and renewedly opened in December 2004.

In 1996, the Agency for Cultural Affairs proposed to register the Sapporo Beer Museum as one of the Important Cultural Properties of Japan. The museum side, however, declined the proposal. This was mainly because if it was registered, the permission of the government would be required to remodel the building each time, which was thought to be inconvenient by the museum. The museum was registered as one of the Hokkaidō Heritage sites on October 22, 2004.

== Overview ==
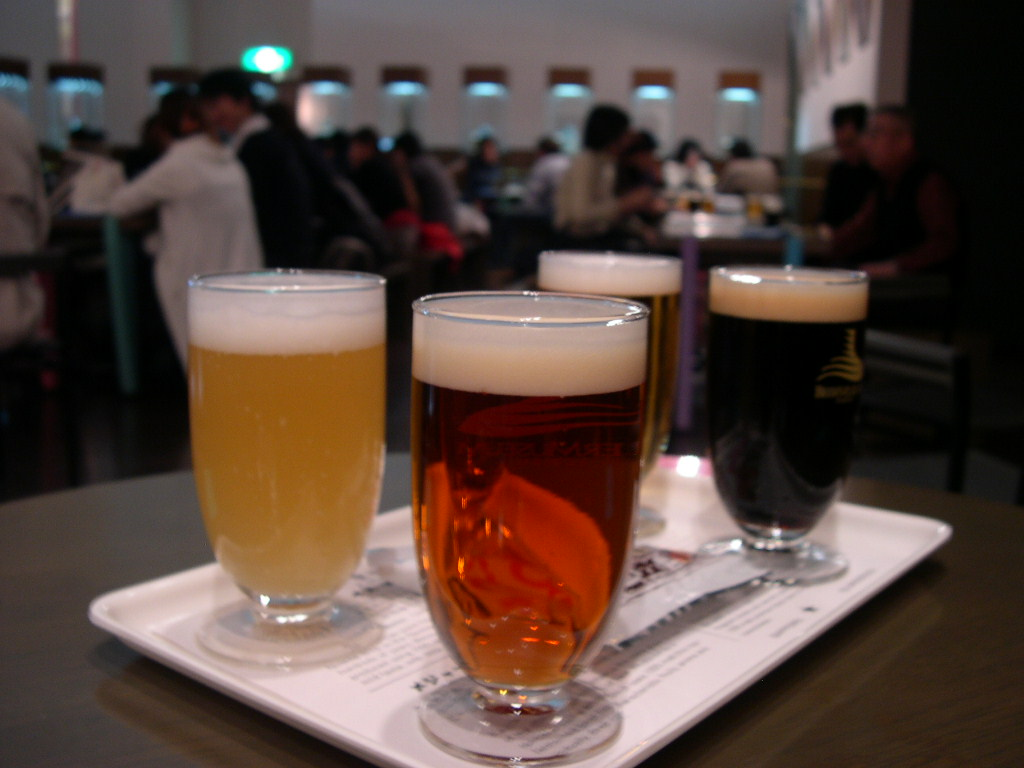
Yebisu beer tasting set of dark and light lagers, hops beer and ale, at the Beer Museum Yebisu

The Sapporo Beer Museum has three floors, and is costs 1000 yen to enter. A museum tour is available. The panels displaying the history of people involved in beer industry and the Sapporo Brewery Inc. are exhibited. Other exhibited items include beer bottles, signs, posters, miniatures of the building, and instruments for brewing beer. Some of them were actually used in the brewery before World War II.

Since some products of the DaiNippon Beer Company, a predecessor of the Sapporo Brewery, were also housed in the museum, materials related to the Yebisu Beer are exhibited as well as the Sapporo Beer ones. A museum bar is located on the second floor, and visitors can try alcohol products of the Sapporo Beer. The first floor has a restaurant called "Star Hall", and a museum shop. The Sapporo Garden Park also houses the Ario Sapporo, a shopping mall, and the Sapporo Beer Garden, which is connected to the museum.

== See also ==
- Asahi Beer Hall
