= Moerenuma Park =

Municipal park in Sapporo, Japan

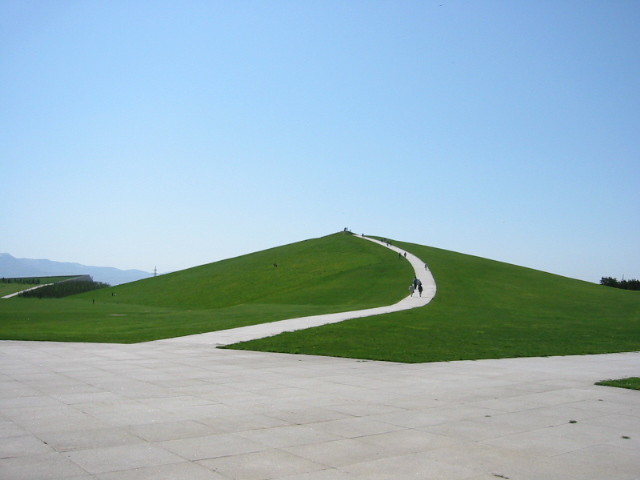
- The 62 m high Mt. Moere in Moerenuma Park.
- Interactive map of Moerenuma Park
- Location: Sapporo Japan
- Coordinates: 43.124°N 141.430°E43.1231°N 141.424°E
- Area: 188.8 hectares (467 acres)
- Created: 2005
- Visitors: 831,350 (2006)
- Parking: 1500 vehicles
- Website: https://moerenumapark.jp/english/

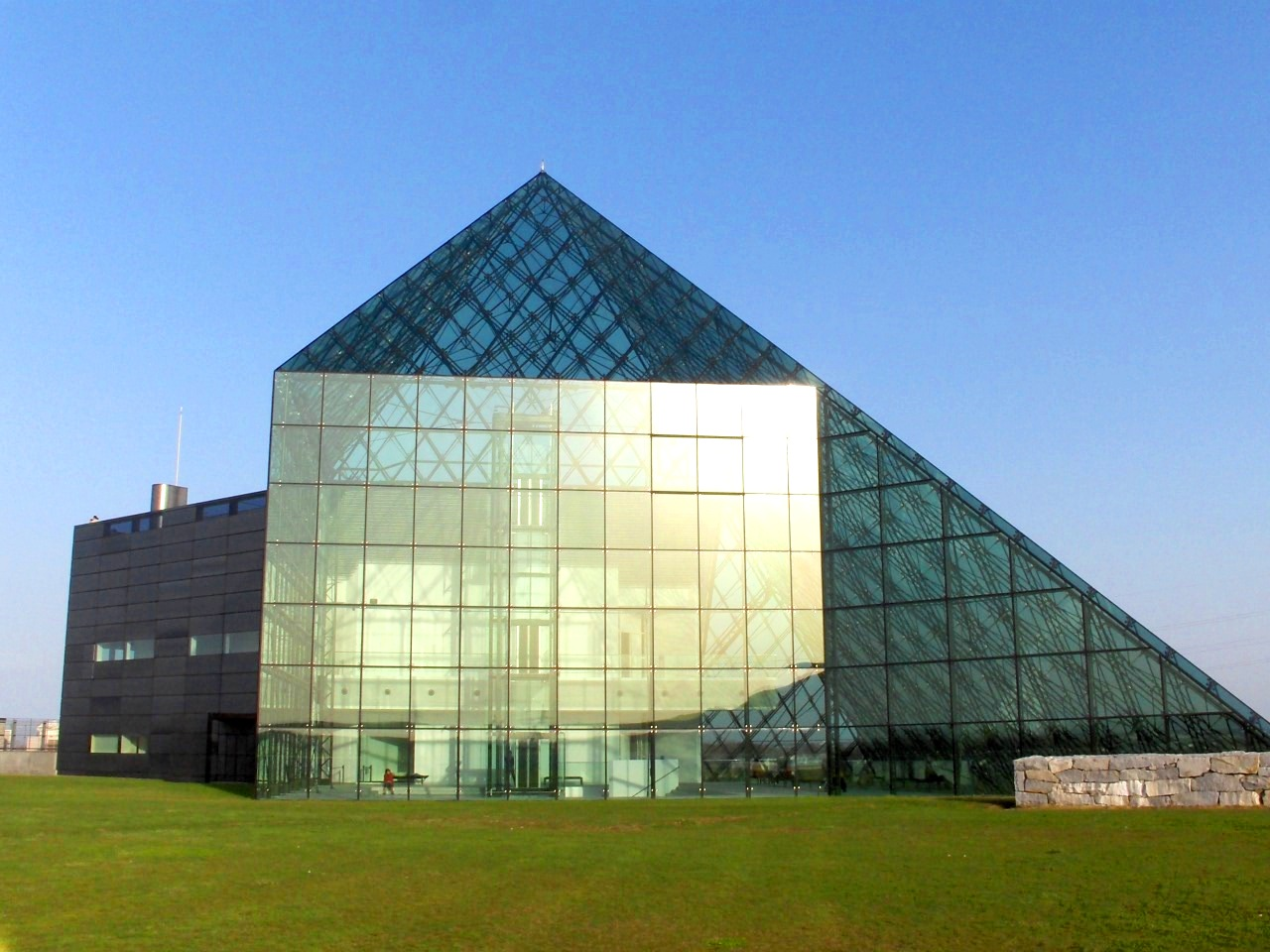
The glass pyramid "Hidamari" in the park.

Moerenuma Park (モエレ沼公園, Moerenuma Kōen) is a municipal park in Sapporo, Japan. It has playground equipment, outdoor sports fields, and objects that are designed by Isamu Noguchi, a Japanese American artist. Construction began in 1988; the park opened in 2005. It won the Good Design Award in 2002.

== History ==
Before the construction of Moerenuma Park, the place has been used as a garbage reclaimed ground since 1979. Under the Sapporo Circular Greenbelt Concept, a city planning project that aims at developing the urban areas of Sapporo with greenbelts and parks, construction began in 1982. Sapporo asked Isamu Noguchi to design the park.

Noguchi's first visit to Sapporo was in March 1988, when the place was still used as a reclaimed ground in part. Impressed with the landscape and the northern skyline, Noguchi contracted the offer from Sapporo government and made the master plan of the park, which includes the concept of "park that is considered to be one complete sculpture." On December 30 in the same year, however, right after making a miniature model of the planned park, Isamu Noguchi died of heart failure in New York City, and the park was constructed with his master plan from 1989.

In 1990, land reclamation of garbage was totally closed. It had 71.2 ha and 2,736,000 tons of garbage carried to the place until 1990.

In 1997, Moerenuma Park made a park twinning agreement with the Bayfront Park in Miami, United States. The park won the Good Design Award in 2002, 11th Sapporo Urban Scenery Award in 2003, and Hokkaidō Red Brick Architectural Award in 2004. The park was partly open during construction, and on July 1, 2005, the entire construction was completed (although it was initially planned to be complete in 2004). The Sapporo International Art Festival held events at the park in 2014, 2017, and 2024.

== Outline ==
The name "Moerenuma" (Moere marsh) is derived from the word "Moyre pet" in Ainu language, which means "a slowly flowing river." Moere marsh was in the place long before the park was constructed. The official name of the marsh is Shinoro New River. It is said that river was made because of perpetual flood in the past. It currently connects to the Kariki New River. The Moere marsh is surrounding the whole area of the park ground.

The entire area of the park is 1,888,000 m² including the Moere marsh, coming to a total cost of 27 billion yen. The park has 120 pieces of playground equipment, about 3,000 cherry trees, and the parking lots holds 1,500 vehicles. The construction is mainly supervised by Isamu Noguchi Foundation and George Sadao.

One of the biggest attractions of the park is a glass pyramid near the eastern entrance. The pyramid has the nickname "Hidamari", which means "sunny spot" in Japanese. The nickname was given in 2002 and selected from 2,340 applications. With a floor space of 5,328 m², the pyramid has three floors and a roof overlooking a large part of the park. The top floor houses the gallery of Isamu Noguchi and the miniature model of the park. A restaurant and museum shop are on the ground floor. The pyramid has an air conditioning system to cool down inside in summer, using snow stored in a neighbouring storage building during winter. Hidamari is also used for workshops and events including the Prestigious International Conference on Music and Perception with a concert by John Kaizen Neptune in 2008 in the rooms on the ground and second floors.

The most visible feature of the park is the 62 metre high Mt. Moere a constructed earthwork which has views of Sapporo, the mountains, the Ishikari River, and the Sea of Japan. Tetra Mound which includes stainless steel and has an adjacent square where numerous events have been held. More playground equipment is near the Forest of Cherry Trees and the Moere Beach, which is a shallow pond open during summer.

A 150-metre canal, the Aqua Plaza, is in the centre of the park, and the Sea Fountain is constructed near the canal. The fountain reaches 25 meters high when it jets out, and it is closed during winter. The monument called Music Shell is used as the musical venue. It is shaped to imitate two shells swelling up from the ground — as the name indicates.

The park contains sports grounds such as a tennis court, baseball field and athletic field. These are opened from April to November. Registration to use these facilities is required at the management office. Visitors can rent bicycles. As some park facilities are closed during the winter months, visitors can enjoy cross-country skiing in the park instead. Courses are set up, which enable visitors to view objects in the park whilst skiing. Cross-country skiing equipment is lent at the office in the glass pyramid.

== Nearby ==
Close to Moerenuma Park, there is the Sapporo Satoland – an amusement park focusing on agriculture, natural history, and archaeology. The facility includes the Okadama Jomon Ruins Experience Learning Museum which hosts educational events focused on Jomon culture. Additionally, there is a indoor sports stadium Tsudome (Sapporo Community Dome) close by the Okadama Airport.

== Access ==
- Hokkaido Chuo Bus (Higashi69 or Higashi79): 25 minutes from Kanjō-Dōri-Higashi Station (Tōhō Line) to 'Moere Koen Higashiguchi' bus stop, then a 10-minute walk to the Glass Pyramid.
