= Tenshi College =

Japanese university

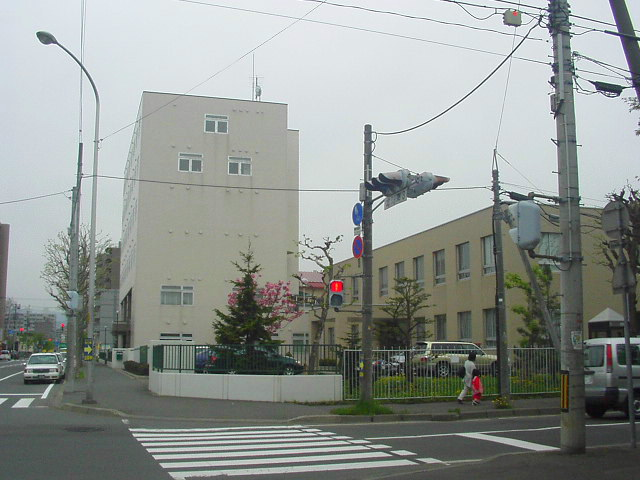
- Type: Private
- Location: Japan

Tenshi College (天使大学, Tenshi daigaku) is a private university in Higashi-ku, Sapporo, Hokkaido, Japan. The predecessor of the school, a women's vocational school, was founded in 1947. It was chartered as a junior college in 1950. In 2000, it became coeducational, adopting the present name at the same time. This school has its roots in a hospital started by 7 nuns from Europe who built a hospital for the poor in Sapporo.
