= Kirin Cup Soccer =

International football tournament

- Organiser(s): JFA
- Founded: 1978; 48 years ago
- Region: Japan (AFC)
- Teams: 4 (since 2016)
- Current champions: Japan (12th title)
- Most championships: Japan (12 titles)
- Website: kirin.co.jp/soccer
- 2026 Kirin Cup Soccer

The Kirin Cup Soccer (Japanese: キリンカップサッカー) is an association football tournament organised in Japan by the Kirin Brewery Company. The host, Japan, is a participant in every edition. The tournament was founded in 1978 then known as Japan Cup (International competition which national teams and clubs participated in), and was last held in its full form in 2022. From 1992 onwards, the format was changed to a round robin national team competition. The first nation to win the competition was Argentina. Japan are the tournament's most successful team with twelve titles, followed by Peru with three titles. As of 2026, the current cup holders are Japan.

Since the start of the international competitions in 1992, the tournament has hosted a variety of teams from South America, Europe, Asia, and Africa. Out of the South American members of CONMEBOL who have been invited (Argentina, Chile, Colombia, Ecuador, Paraguay, Uruguay and Peru), Peru have been the most successful (three titles). Out of the European invitees, there have been seven different champions, the most successful being the Czech Republic with two titles, with Hungary, France, Bosnia and Herzegovina, Belgium, Slovakia and Scotland winning one title each. Aside from Japan, the only other Asian country to have won the tournament are the United Arab Emirates (2005), who shared the title with Peru.

== Tournaments ==
All times are Japan standard time (UTC+9)

=== 1978 Japan Cup ===
Won by Borussia Mönchengladbach and Palmeiras. In the semi final Palmeiras beat English club Coventry City 1–0.

=== 1979 Japan Cup ===
Won by Tottenham Hotspur.

=== 1980 Japan Cup Kirin World Soccer ===
Won by Middlesbrough F.C.

=== 1981 Japan Cup Kirin World Soccer ===
Won by Club Brugge KV.

=== 1982 Japan Cup Kirin World Soccer ===
Team	Pld	W	D	L	GF	GA	Pts	Result
(West Germany) Werder Bremen	4	3	1	0	15	3	7	Champions
Japan	4	3	0	1	13	4	6	
(Netherlands) Feyenoord	4	2	1	1	10	7	5	
Singapore	4	0	1	3	3	14	1	
(Japan) NKK Nippon Kokan	4	0	1	3	1	14	1	

30 May 1982	Japan	5–2	(Netherlands) Feyenoord	Tokyo, Japan
	Tsunami; Ozaki		van Hanegem de Leeuw	Stadium: National Stadium

30 May 1982	Singapore	1–1	(Japan) NKK Nippon Kokan	Tokyo, Japan
				Stadium: National Stadium

2 June 1982	Japan	2–0	Singapore	Hiroshima, Japan
	Totsuka; Ozaki

2 June 1982	Werder Bremen (West Germany)	6–0	(Japan) NKK Nippon Kokan	Yokohama, Japan
	Neubarth; Otten; Möhlmann

4 June 1982	Werder Bremen (West Germany)	6–1	Singapore	Nishigaoka, Japan
	Neubarth; N. Meier; Otten; Okudera own goal		Ahmad

4 June 1982	Feyenoord (Netherlands)	2–0	(Japan) NKK Nippon Kokan	Kobe, Japan
	Nielsen; Vermeulen

6 June 1982	Japan	1–2	(West Germany) Werder Bremen	Tokyo, Japan
	Kimura		Möhlmann; N. Meier	Stadium: National Stadium

6 June 1982	Feyenoord (Netherlands)	5–1	Singapore	Miyagi, Japan
	Wijnstekers; Bouwens		Ahmad

9 June 1982	Japan	5–0	(Japan) NKK Nippon Kokan	Tokyo, Japan
	Yokoyama; Kaneda; Ozaki; Hashiratani			Stadium: National Stadium

9 June 1982	Werder Bremen (West Germany)	1–1	(Netherlands) Feyenoord	Tokyo, Japan
	Schaaf		Bouwens	Stadium: National Stadium

=== 1983 Japan Cup Kirin World Soccer ===
Team	Pld	W	D	L	GF	GA	Pts	Result
(England) Newcastle United	4	2	2	0	6	1	6	Champions
(Brazil) Botafogo	4	1	2	1	4	3	4	
(Japan) Yamaha	4	1	2	1	3	3	4	
Syria	4	1	1	2	3	4	3	
Japan	4	1	1	2	2	7	3	

29 May 1983	Japan	0–4	(England) Newcastle United	Japan
			Keegan 11'; Waddle 20', 68'; Clarke 37'

29 May 1983	Yamaha (Japan)	2–1	Syria	Shizuoka, Japan
	Nagasawa; Mochizuki		Jamar

31 May 1983	Yamaha (Japan)	1–1	(Brazil) Botafogo	Omiya, Japan
	Yoshida		Nunes

31 May 1983	Newcastle United (England)	1–1	Syria	Okayama, Japan
	McCreery		Essam Zino

2 June 1983	Japan	0–0	(Japan) Yamaha	Yokohama

2 June 1983	Syria	1–0	(Brazil) Botafogo	Kobe, Japan

4 June 1983	Japan	1–3	(Brazil) Botafogo	Japan
			Nunes; Té

4 June 1983	Newcastle United (England)	1–0	(Japan) Yamaha	Mizuho-ku, Nagoya, Japan
	Waddle

7 June 1983	Japan	1–0	Syria	Shibuya, Tokyo, Japan
	Kaneda 63'			Stadium: Yoyogi National Gymnasium; Attendance: 11,968; Referee: Walter Eschweiler (West Germany)

7 June 1983	Newcastle United (England)	0–0	(Brazil) Botafogo

=== 1984 Japan Cup Kirin World Soccer ===
==== Group A ====
Team	Pld	W	D	L	GF	GA	GD	Pts	Qualification
China	2	1	0	1	3	3	0	2	Qualification to the semi-finals
Toulouse	2	1	0	1	3	3	0	2	Qualification to the semi-finals
Japan	2	1	0	1	1	1	0	2	

27 May 1984	Japan	0–1	Toulouse	Tokyo, Japan
			Stopyra	Stadium: National Stadium

29 May 1984	China	3–2	Toulouse	Hiroshima, Japan
	Gu Guangming; Liu Haiguang; Lin Qiang		Roussey; Stopyra

31 May 1984	Japan	1–0	China	Saitama, Japan
	Kato			Stadium: Omiya Stadium; Referee: Maidin Bin Singah (Singapur)

==== Group B ====
Team	Pld	W	D	L	GF	GA	GD	Pts	Qualification
Internacional	2	1	1	0	3	0	+3	3	Qualification to the semi-finals
Republic of Ireland	2	0	2	0	0	0	0	2	Qualification to the semi-finals
Japan Universiade XI	2	0	1	1	0	3	−3	1	

27 May 1984	Republic of Ireland	0–0	Japan Universiade XI	Matsuyama, Japan

30 May 1984	Internacional	2–1	Japan Universiade XI	Kobe, Japan
	(o.g.); Milton Cruz; Kita

1 June 1984	Internacional	0–0	Republic of Ireland	Mizuho-ku, Nagoya, Japan

3 June 1984 Semi-final	Internacional	4–1	Toulouse	Yokohama, Japan
	Rubén Paz; Jair; Silvinho (o.g.)		Roussey

3 June 1984 Semi-final	Republic of Ireland	1–0	China	Sapporo, Japan
	O'Keefe 57'	Report		Stadium: Maruyama Stadium

5 June 1984 Final	Internacional	2–1	Republic of Ireland	Tokyo, Japan
	Milton Cruz; Rubén Paz		Stapleton	Stadium: National Stadium; Attendance: 28,000

=== 1985 Kirin Cup Soccer ===
Team	Pld	W	D	L	GS	GA	GD	Pts	Qualification
(Brazil) Santos	5	4	1	0	19	4	+15	9	Qualification to the final
Uruguay	5	3	2	0	16	6	+10	8	Qualification to the final
(England) West Ham United	5	1	3	1	13	7	+6	5	
(Japan) Yomiuri	5	2	1	2	9	8	+1	5	
Japan	5	1	1	3	7	11	−4	3	
(Malaysia) Malaysian Tigers	5	0	0	5	3	31	−28	0	

26 May 1985	Japan	1–4	Uruguay	Tokyo, Japan
	Kimura 15'		Carlos Aguilera 44', 73' da Silva 51', 69'	Stadium: National Stadium; Attendance: 30,000; Referee: Henk van Ettekoven (Netherlands)

26 May 1985	Santos (Brazil)	2–1	(England) West Ham United	Shimizu, Japan
	Mario Sérgio 13'; Zé Sérgio 34'		Goddard 57'	Attendance: 10,000

26 May 1985	Yomiuri (Japan)	5–0	(Malaysia) Malaysian Tigers	Sendai, Japan

28 May 1985	Japan	2–2	(England) West Ham United	Okayama, Japan
	Hara; Mizunuma		Potts; Swindlehurst

28 May 1985	Santos (Brazil)	8–1	(Malaysia) Malaysian Tigers	Okayama, Japan
	Mirandinha; Lima; Mario Sérgio; Gersinho; Humberto		Azhar Shahrin

28 May 1985	Uruguay	4–3	(Japan) Yomiuri	Omiya, Japan
	Carlos Aguilera

30 May 1985	Japan	0–1	(Japan) Yomiuri	Tokyo, Japan
			Totsuka 78'

30 May 1985	West Ham United (England)	9–2	(Malaysia) Malaysian Tigers	Tokyo, Japan
	Cottee; Ravindan (o.g.); Swindlehurst; Martin; Pike; Whitton		Shahdan

30 May 1985	Uruguay	1–1	(Brazil) Santos	Hiroshima, Japan
	Carlos Aguilera 21'		Davi 60'	Attendance: 15,000

1 June 1985	Uruguay	6–0	(Malaysia) Malaysian Tigers	Osaka, Japan
	Carrasco; Pereira; Alzugaray; Barrios; Carlos Aguilera; Cabrera

2 June 1985	Japan	1–4	(Brazil) Santos	Kobe, Japan
	Hara 85'		Zé Sérgio 16', 37'; Gersinho 21'; Mirandinha 29'

2 June 1985	Yomiuri (Japan)	0–0	(England) West Ham United	Sapporo, Japan
				Attendance: 7,100; Referee: Okaya (Japan)

4 June 1985	Japan	3–0	(Malaysia) Malaysian Tigers	Nagoya, Japan
	Kimura 32'; Mizunuma 69'; Hashiratani 89'			Attendance: 15,000; Referee: Kim Soo-deok (South Korea)

4 June 1985	West Ham United (England)	1–1	Uruguay	Nagoya, Japan
	Swindlehurst 26'		Montelongo 54'

4 June 1985	Santos (Brazil)	4–0	(Japan) Yomiuri	Yokohama, Japan
	Mirandinha; Davi; Gersinho

6 June 1985 Final	Santos (Brazil)	4–2	Uruguay	Tokyo, Japan
	Zé Sérgio 22', 89'; Mirandinha 41', 50'		Carlos Aguilera 15'; Carrasco 81'	Stadium: National Stadium; Attendance: 35,000; Referee: Shizuo Takada (Japan)

=== 1986 Kirin Cup Soccer ===
Team	Pld	W	D	L	GS	GA	GD	Pts	Result
(Brazil) Palmeiras	3	3	0	0	10	3	+7	6	Qualification to the final
(West Germany) Werder Bremen	3	1	1	1	3	5	−2	3	Qualification to the final
Japan	3	1	0	2	3	5	−2	2	
Algeria B	3	0	1	2	4	7	−3	1	

11 May 1986	Japan	2–1	Algeria B	Matsuyama, Japan
	Hashiratani		Djahmoune

11 May 1986	Palmeiras (Brazil)	4–0	(West Germany) Werder Bremen	Fukuoka, Japan
	Mirandinha 20', 21', 25'; Jorginho Putinatti 56'

14 May 1986	Japan	0–2	(West Germany) Werder Bremen	Tokyo, Japan
			Burgsmüller 10'; Neubarth 27'

14 May 1986	Palmeiras (Brazil)	4–2	Algeria B	Shizuoka, Japan
	Mirandinha; Mendonça; Barbosa		Djahmoune; Sabbah

16 May 1986	Japan	1–2	(Brazil) Palmeiras	Kyoto, Japan
	Kimura 51'		Denys 34'; Mirandinha 71' (pen.)

16 May 1986	Werder Bremen (West Germany)	1–1	Algeria B	Nagoya, Japan
	Meier 8'		Djahmoune 16'

18 May 1986 Final	Werder Bremen (West Germany)	4–2 (a.e.t.)	(Brazil) Palmeiras	Tokyo, Japan
	Neubarth 56'; Möhlmann 91'; Ordenewitz 99', 101'		Jorginho Putinatti 26'; Mirandinha 106' (pen.)

=== 1987 Kirin Cup Soccer ===
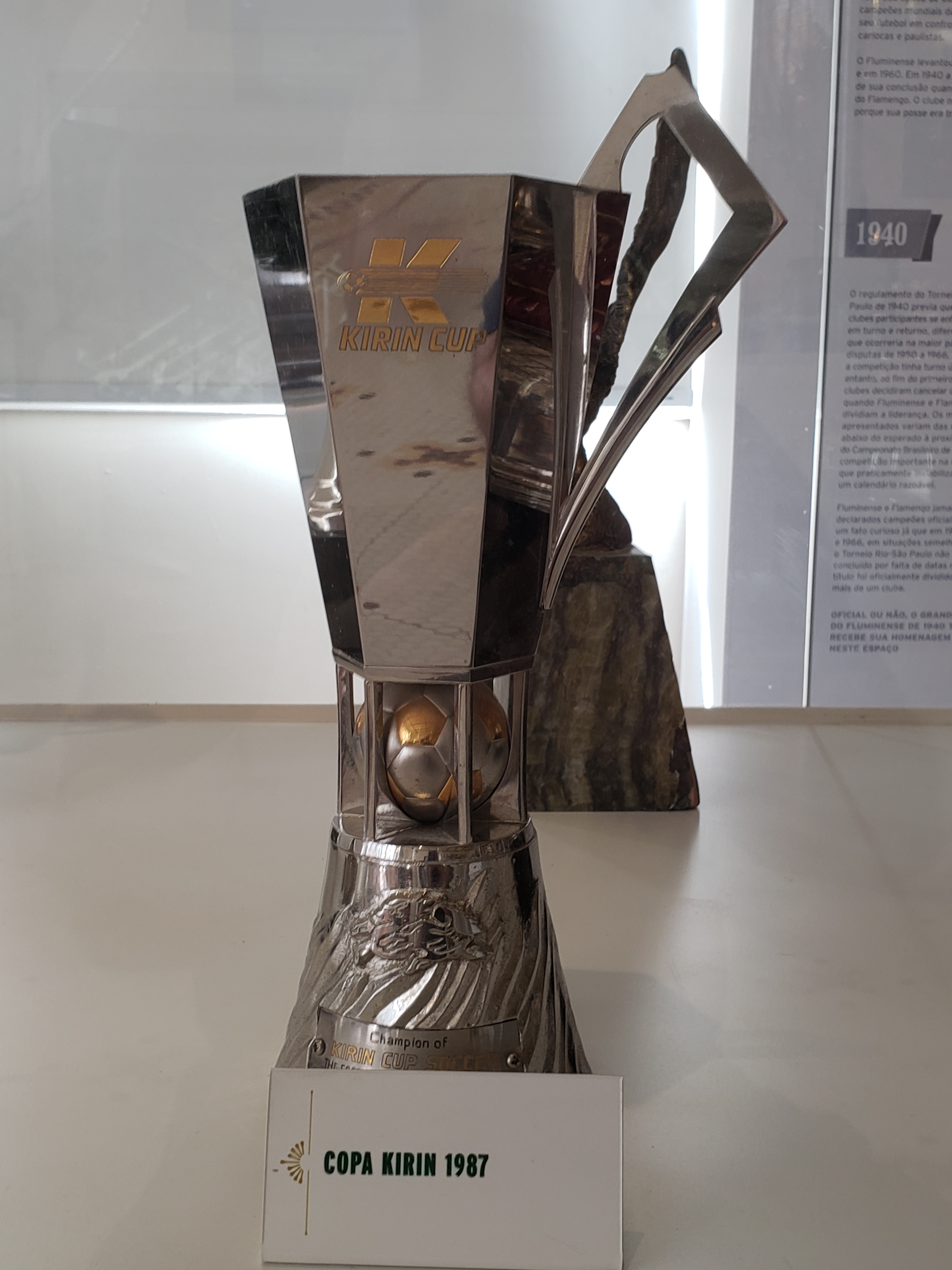
Kirin Cup Soccer 1987.

Team	Pld	W	D	L	GS	GA	GD	Pts	Qualification
(Italy) Torino	3	2	1	0	5	2	+3	5	Qualification to the final
(Brazil) Fluminense	3	1	2	0	8	1	+7	4	Qualification to the final
Japan	3	0	2	1	2	3	−1	2	
Senegal	3	0	1	2	3	12	−9	1	

24 May 1987	Japan	0–0	(Brazil) Fluminense	Tokyo, Japan
				Stadium: National Stadium; Attendance: 20,000; Referee: Joe Worrall (England)

24 May 1987	Torino (Italy)	3–1	Senegal	Sapporo, Japan
	Corradini 30'; Lentini 46'; Mariani 80'		Bunjai 86'	Stadium: Maruyama Baseball Stadium; Attendance: 3,500

25 May 1987	Torino (Italy)	1–1	(Brazil) Fluminense	Shizuoka, Japan
	Junior 6'		Paulinho 47'	Stadium: Shizuoka Kusanagi Baseball Stadium; Attendance: 7,500; Referee: Kiichiro Tachi (Japan)

27 May 1987	Japan	2–2	Senegal	Hiroshima, Japan
	Hara 40'; Matsuyama 50'		Ndao 43', 57' (pen.)	Stadium: Prefectural Stadium

29 May 1987	Japan	0–1	(Italy) Torino	Nagoya, Japan
			Corradini	Stadium: Mizuho Athletic Stadium; Attendance: 26,000

29 May 1987	Fluminense (Brazil)	7–0	Senegal	Shizuoka, Kobe, Japan
	Assis 5'; Tato 24'; Eduardo 25', 34'; Washington 30', 87'; Romerito 67'			Stadium: Kobe Central Stadium; Referee: Yasuki Nagoya (Japan)

31 May 1987 Final	Fluminense (Brazil)	2–0	(Italy) Torino	Tokyo, Japan
	Washington 26'; Tato 44'			Stadium: National Stadium; Attendance: 36,000; Referee: Joe Worrall (England)

=== 1988 Kirin Cup Soccer ===
Team	Pld	W	D	L	GS	GA	GD	Pts	Qualification
(West Germany) Bayer Leverkusen	3	2	1	0	4	1	+3	5	Qualification to the final
(Brazil) Flamengo	3	1	2	0	5	3	+2	4	Qualification to the final
China	3	1	1	1	4	3	+1	3	
Japan	3	0	0	3	1	7	−6	0	

29 May 1988	Japan	1–3	(Brazil) Flamengo	Tokyo, Japan
	Yoshida 86'		Zico 9' (pen.); Paulo César 52'; Delacir

29 May 1988	Bayer Leverkusen (West Germany)	2–0	China	Takamatsu, Japan
	Götz; Falkenmayer

1 June 1988	Bayer Leverkusen (West Germany)	1–1	(Brazil) Flamengo	Kyoto, Japan
	Cha Bum-kun 24'		Edinho 36'

2 June 1988	Japan	0–3	China	Nagoya, Japan
			Wang Baoshan 24'; Gao Sheng 41'; Ma Lin 45'	Stadium: Mizuho Stadium; Referee: Jamal Al Sharif (Syria)

5 June 1988	Japan	0–1	(West Germany) Bayer Leverkusen	Omiya, Japan

5 June 1988	China	1–1	(Brazil) Flamengo	Kagoshima, Japan
	Ma Lin 53'		Gérson 17'

7 June 1988 Final	Flamengo (Brazil)	1–0	(West Germany) Bayer Leverkusen	Tokyo, Japan
	Zico 55'

=== 1991 Kirin Cup Soccer ===
Team	Pld	W	D	L	GS	GA	GD	Pts	Result
Japan	3	3	0	0	7	1	+6	6	Champions
(Brazil) Vasco	3	1	1	1	4	2	+2	3	
(England) Tottenham Hotspur	3	1	1	1	2	5	−3	3	
Thailand	3	0	0	3	1	6	−5	0	

2 June 1991	Japan	1–0	Thailand	Tendō, Japan
	Hashiratani 89' (pen.)			Stadium: Yamagata Park Stadium; Attendance: 21,000; Referee: Samuel Chan Yam-Ming (British Hong Kong)

2 June 1991	Tottenham Hotspur (England)	0–0	(Brazil) Vasco

5 June 1991	Japan	2–1	(Brazil) Vasco	Kyoto, Japan
	Kitazawa 41'; Miura 74'	(Report)	Bismarck 85' (pen.)	Stadium: Nishikyogoku Athletic Stadium; Attendance: 22,000; Referee: Samuel Chan Yam-Ming (British Hong Kong)

5 June 1991	Thailand	1–2	(England) Tottenham Hotspur	Nagoya, Japan
	K. Viton		Hendry; Edwards	Stadium: Mizuho Athletic Stadium; Attendance: 25,000

9 June 1991	Thailand	0–3	(Brazil) Vasco

9 June 1991	Japan	4–0	(England) Tottenham Hotspur	Tokyo, Japan
	Kitazawa 2'; Miura 8', 41'; Sakakura 66'			Stadium: National Stadium; Attendance: 45,000

=== 1992 Kirin Cup Soccer ===
Team	Pld	W	D	L	GS	GA	GD	Pts	Result
Argentina	2	2	0	0	2	0	+2	4	Champions
Wales	2	1	0	1	1	1	0	2	
Japan	2	0	0	2	0	2	−2	0	

30 May 1992	Japan	0–1	Argentina	Tokyo, Japan
			Batistuta 53'	Stadium: Yoyoki National Stadium; Attendance: 60,000; Referee: Kil Ki-chul (South Korea)

3 June 1992	Argentina	1–0	Wales	Gifu, Japan
	Batistuta 87'			Stadium: Gifu Nagaragawa Stadium; Attendance: 31,000; Referee: Kiichiro Tachi (Japan)

7 June 1992	Japan	0–1	Wales	Matsuyama, Japan
			Bowen 40'	Stadium: Ehime Sports Complex Athletics Stadium; Attendance: 30,000; Referee: Samuel Chan Yam-Ming (British Hong Kong)

=== 1993 Kirin Cup Soccer ===
Team	Pld	W	D	L	GS	GA	GD	Pts	Result
Hungary	2	1	1	0	1	0	+1	4	Champions
Japan	2	1	0	1	3	2	+1	3	
United States	2	0	1	1	1	3	−2	1	

7 March 1993	Japan	0–1	Hungary	Fukuoka, Japan
			Kiprich 47'	Stadium: Hakatanomori Football Stadium; Attendance: 30,000; Referee: Majid Jay (United States)

10 March 1993	Hungary	0–0	United States	Nagoya, Japan
				Stadium: Mizuho Athletic Stadium; Attendance: 12,500; Referee: Shinichiro Obata (Japan)

14 March 1993	Japan	3–1	United States	Tokyo, Japan
	Miura 36', 80'; Lapper 68' (o.g.)		Pérez 23'	Stadium: Yoyoki National Stadium; Attendance: 48,000; Referee: Kim Gwang-taek (South Korea)

=== 1994 Kirin Cup Soccer ===
Team	Pld	W	D	L	GS	GA	GD	Pts	Result
France	2	2	0	0	5	1	+4	6	Champions
Australia	2	0	1	1	1	2	−1	1	
Japan	2	0	1	1	2	5	−3	1	

22 May 1994	Japan	1–1	Australia	Hiroshima, Japan
	Asano 10'		A. Vidmar 67'	Stadium: Big Arch Stadium; Attendance: 27,350; Referee: Piron Unprasert (Thailand)

26 May 1994	Australia	0–1	France	Kobe, Japan
			Cantona 43'	Stadium: Kobe Universiade Memorial Stadium; Attendance: 16,743; Referee: Masayoshi Okada (Japan)

29 May 1994	Japan	1–4	France	Tokyo, Japan
	Ogura 78'		Djorkaeff 15'; Papin 18'; Kurosaki 53' (o.g.); Ginola 55'	Stadium: Yoyoki National Stadium; Attendance: 48,841; Referee: Mohamed Nazri Abdullah (Malaysia)

=== 1995 Kirin Cup Soccer ===
Team	Pld	W	D	L	GS	GA	GD	Pts	Result
Japan	2	1	1	0	3	0	+3	4	Champions
Scotland	2	1	1	0	2	1	+1	4	
Ecuador	2	0	0	2	1	5	-4	0	

21 May 1995	Japan	0–0	Scotland	Hiroshima, Japan
				Stadium: Hiroshima Big Arch; Attendance: 24,556; Referee: Armando Pérez Hoyos (Colombia)

24 May 1995	Scotland	2–1	Ecuador	Toyama, Japan
	Robertson 75'; Crawford 83'		Hurtado 79' (pen.)	Stadium: Toyama Athletic Recreation Park Stadium; Attendance: 5,669; Referee: Masayoshi Okada (Japan)

28 May 1995	Japan	3–0	Ecuador	Tokyo, Japan
	Nakayama 36'; Miura 46' (pen.), 53' (pen.)			Stadium: National Stadium; Attendance: 53,438; Referee: Lutz Michael Fröhlich (Germany)

=== 1996 Kirin Cup Soccer ===
Team	Pld	W	D	L	GS	GA	GD	Pts	Result
Japan	2	2	0	0	4	2	+2	6	Champions
Mexico	2	0	1	1	2	3	−1	1	
FR Yugoslavia	2	0	1	1	0	1	−1	1	

23 May 1996	Mexico	0–0	FR Yugoslavia	Shizuoka, Japan
				Stadium: IAI Stadium Nihondaira; Attendance: 8,604; Referee: Masayoshi Okada (Japan)

26 May 1996	Japan	1–0	FR Yugoslavia	Tokyo, Japan
	Miura 62'			Stadium: National Stadium; Attendance: 50,632; Referee: Kim Young-joo (South Korea)

29 May 1996	Japan	3–2	Mexico	Fukuoka, Japan
	Morishima 35'; Miura 45'; Soma 82'		del Olmo 5'; Pelaez 16'	Stadium: Hakatanomori Football Stadium; Attendance: 17,432; Referee: Nik Ahmad Yaakub (Malaysia)

=== 1997 Kirin Cup Soccer ===
Team	Pld	W	D	L	GS	GA	GD	Pts	Result
Japan	2	2	0	0	5	3	+2	6	Champions
Croatia	2	0	1	1	4	5	−1	1	
Turkey	2	0	1	1	1	2	−1	1	

8 June 1997	Japan	4–3	Croatia	Tokyo, Japan
	Hirano 34'; Miura 49', 53'; Morishima 89'		Asanovic 77', 79' (pen.); Vlaovic 90'	Stadium: Yoyoki National Stadium; Attendance: 50,136; Referee: Kim Taeyoung (South Korea)

12 June 1997	Croatia	1–1	Turkey	Sendai, Japan
	Erceg 21'		Ertuğrul 77'	Stadium: Yurtec Stadium Sendai; Attendance: 15,687; Referee: Masayoshi Okada (Japan)

15 June 1997	Japan	1–0	Turkey	Osaka, Japan
	Morishima 25'			Stadium: Nagai Stadium; Attendance: 35,029; Referee: Park Jong-kyu (South Korea)

=== 1998 Kirin Cup Soccer ===
Team	Pld	W	D	L	GS	GA	GD	Pts	Result
Czech Republic	2	1	1	0	1	0	+1	4	Champions
Japan	2	0	2	0	1	1	0	2	
Paraguay	2	0	1	1	1	2	−1	1	

17 May 1998	Japan	1–1	Paraguay	Tokyo, Japan
	Soma 86'		Ayala 7'	Stadium: Yoyoki National Stadium; Attendance: 53,408; Referee: Kwon Jong-chul (South Korea)

21 May 1998	Czech Republic	1–0	Paraguay	Kobe, Japan
	Šmicer 12'			Stadium: Kobe Universiade Memorial Stadium; Attendance: 6,100; Referee: Naotsugu Fuse (Japan)

24 May 1998	Japan	0–0	Czech Republic	Yokohama, Japan
				Stadium: Yokohama International Stadium; Attendance: 66,930; Referee: Russamee Jindamai (Thailand)

=== 1999 Kirin Cup Soccer ===
Team	Pld	W	D	L	GS	GA	GD	Pts	Result
Peru	2	0	2	0	1	1	0	2	Joint Champions
Belgium	2	0	2	0	1	1	0	2	Joint Champions
Japan	2	0	2	0	0	0	0	2	

30 May 1999	Peru	1–1	Belgium	Kyoto, Japan
	Maestri 6'		Tanghe 28'	Stadium: Nishikyogoku Athletic Stadium; Attendance: 9,262; Referee: Naotsugu Fuse (Japan)

3 June 1999	Japan	0–0	Belgium	Tokyo, Japan
				Stadium: National Stadium; Attendance: 54,985; Referee: Kim Tae-young (South Korea)

6 June 1999	Japan	0–0	Peru	Yokohama, Japan
				Stadium: Yokohama International Stadium; Attendance: 67,354; Referee: Panya Hanlumyaung (Thailand)

=== 2000 Kirin Cup Soccer ===
Team	Pld	W	D	L	GS	GA	GD	Pts	Result
Japan	2	1	1	0	3	1	+2	4	Joint Champions
Slovakia	2	1	1	0	3	1	+2	4	Joint Champions
Bolivia	2	0	0	2	0	4	−4	0	

11 June 2000	Japan	1–1	Slovakia	Rifu, Japan
	Nakamura 9'		Dzúrik 7'	Stadium: Miyagi Stadium; Attendance: 45,831; Referee: Kim Young-joo (South Korea)

14 June 2000	Slovakia	2–0	Bolivia	Tosu, Japan
	Kratochvíl 21'; Fabuš 45'			Stadium: Tosu Stadium; Attendance: 8,023; Referee: Masayoshi Okada (Japan)

18 June 2000	Japan	2–0	Bolivia	Yokohama, Japan
	Yanagisawa 7', 34'			Stadium: Yokohama International Stadium; Attendance: 65,073; Referee: Sun Baojie (China)

=== 2001 Kirin Cup Soccer ===
Team	Pld	W	D	L	GS	GA	GD	Pts	Result
Japan	2	2	0	0	3	0	+3	6	Champions
Paraguay	2	1	0	1	2	2	0	3	
FR Yugoslavia	2	0	0	2	0	3	−3	0	

28 June 2001	Paraguay	2–0	FR Yugoslavia	Tokyo, Japan
	Cáceres 39'; Ferreira 83'			Stadium: National Stadium; Attendance: 21,213; Referee: Masayoshi Okada (Japan)

1 July 2001	Japan	2–0	Paraguay	Sapporo, Japan
	Yanagisawa 16', 50'			Stadium: Sapporo Dome; Attendance: 39,073; Referee: Panya Hanlumyaung (Thailand)

4 July 2001	Japan	1–0	FR Yugoslavia	Ōita, Japan
	Inamoto 21'			Stadium: Big Eye Stadium; Attendance: 38,147; Referee: Vijay Rahman (Singapur)

=== 2002 Kirin Cup Soccer ===
29 April 2002	Japan	1–0	Slovakia	Tokyo, Japan
	Nishizawa 38'			Stadium: National Stadium; Attendance: 55,144; Referee: Bae Jae-young (South Korea)

2 May 2002	Japan	3–3	Honduras	Kobe, Japan
	Nakamura 26', 41'; Alex 76' (pen.)		Pineda 15'; Pavón 27', 45'	Stadium: Kobe Universiade Memorial Stadium; Attendance: 38,130; Referee: Park Sang-gu (South Korea)

=== 2003 Kirin Cup Soccer ===
8 June 2003	Japan	1–4	Argentina	Osaka, Japan
	Akita 55'		Saviola 30'; Zanetti 45'; Romeo 78'; Rodríguez 82'	Stadium: Nagai Stadium; Attendance: 42,508; Referee: Herbert Fandel (Germany)

11 June 2003	Japan	0–0	Paraguay	Saitama, Japan
				Stadium: Saitama Stadium 2002; Attendance: 59,891; Referee: Mike Riley (England)

=== 2004 Kirin Cup Soccer ===
Team	Pld	W	D	L	GS	GA	GD	Pts	Result
Japan	2	2	0	0	4	1	+3	6	Champions
Serbia and Montenegro	2	1	0	1	2	1	+1	3	
Slovakia	2	0	0	2	1	5	−4	0	

9 July 2004	Japan	3–1	Slovakia	Hiroshima, Japan
	Fukunishi 45'; Suzuki 66'; Yanagisawa 81'		Babnič 65'	Stadium: Hiroshima Big Arch; Attendance: 34,458; Referee: Matthew Breeze (Australia)

11 July 2004	Serbia and Montenegro	2–0	Slovakia	Fukuoka, Japan
	Milošević 6'; Jestrovic 90'			Stadium: Hakata no Mori Stadium; Attendance: 6,100; Referee: Toshimitsu Yoshida (Japan)

13 July 2004	Japan	1–0	Serbia and Montenegro	Yokohama, Japan
	Endo 48'			Stadium: Yokohama International Stadium; Attendance: 57,616; Referee: Eddie Lennie (Australia)

=== 2005 Kirin Cup Soccer ===
Team	Pld	W	D	L	GS	GA	GD	Pts	Result
Peru	2	1	1	0	1	0	+1	4	Joint Champions
United Arab Emirates	2	1	1	0	1	0	+1	4	Joint Champions
Japan	2	0	0	2	0	2	−2	0	

22 May 2005	Japan	0–1	Peru	Niigata, Japan
			Vassallo 90+4'	Stadium: Niigata Stadium; Attendance: 39,856; Referee: Ľuboš Micheľ (Slovakia)

24 May 2005	United Arab Emirates	0–0	Peru	Toyota, Aichi, Japan
				Stadium: Toyota Stadium; Attendance: 6,536; Referee: Yuichi Nishimura (Japan)

27 May 2005	Japan	0–1	United Arab Emirates	Tokyo, Japan
			Alo Ali 69'	Stadium: National Stadium; Attendance: 53,123; Referee: Ľuboš Micheľ (Slovakia)

=== 2006 Kirin Cup Soccer ===
Team	Pld	W	D	L	GS	GA	GD	Pts	Result
Scotland	2	1	1	0	5	1	+4	4	Champions
Bulgaria	2	1	0	1	3	6	−3	3	
Japan	2	0	1	1	1	2	−1	1	

9 May 2006	Japan	1–2	Bulgaria	Osaka, Japan
	Maki 76'	(Report)	S. Todorov 1'; Yanev 90+1'	Stadium: Nagai Stadium; Attendance: 44,851; Referee: Carlos Megía Dávila (Spain)

11 May 2006	Bulgaria	1–5	Scotland	Kobe, Japan
	Y. Todorov 26'	(Report)	Boyd 13', 43'; McFadden 69'; Burke 77', 88'	Stadium: Kobe Wing Stadium; Attendance: 5,780; Referee: Toru Kamikawa (Japan)

13 May 2006	Japan	0–0	Scotland	Saitama, Japan
		(Report)		Stadium: Saitama Stadium; Attendance: 58,648; Referee: Eduardo Iturralde González (Spain)

=== 2007 Kirin Cup Soccer ===
Team	Pld	W	D	L	GS	GA	GD	Pts	Result
Japan	2	1	1	0	2	0	+2	4	Champions
Colombia	2	1	1	0	1	0	+1	4	
Montenegro	2	0	0	2	0	3	−3	0	

1 June 2007	Japan	2–0	Montenegro	Fukuroi, Japan
	Nakazawa 23'; Takahara 38'			Stadium: Shizuoka Stadium; Attendance: 28,635; Referee: Michael Svendsen (Denmark)

3 June 2007	Colombia	1–0	Montenegro	Matsumoto, Japan
	Falcao 33'			Stadium: Matsumoto Stadium; Attendance: 10,070; Referee: Kenji Ogiya (Japan)

5 June 2007	Japan	0–0	Colombia	Saitama, Japan
				Stadium: Saitama Stadium; Attendance: 45,091; Referee: Nicolai Volquartz (Denmark)

=== 2008 Kirin Cup Soccer ===
Team	Pld	W	D	L	GS	GA	GD	Pts	Result
Japan	2	1	1	0	1	0	1	4	Champions
Paraguay	2	0	2	0	1	1	0	2	
Ivory Coast	2	0	1	1	1	2	−1	1	

22 May 2008	Ivory Coast	1–1	Paraguay	Yokohama, Japan
	Traoré 74'		Bogado 78'	Stadium: Nissan Stadium; Attendance: 5,197; Referee: Kazuhiko Matsumura (Japan)

24 May 2008	Japan	1–0	Ivory Coast	Toyota, Aichi, Japan
	Tamada 21'			Stadium: Toyota Stadium; Attendance: 40,710; Referee: Bruno Paixão (Portugal)

27 May 2008	Japan	0–0	Paraguay	Saitama, Japan
				Stadium: Saitama Stadium; Attendance: 27,998; Referee: Paulo Manuel Gomes Costa (Portugal)

=== 2009 Kirin Cup Soccer ===
Team	Pts	Pld	W	D	L	GS	GA	GD	Result
Japan	6	2	2	0	0	8	0	+8	Champions
Chile	1	2	0	1	1	1	5	–4	
Belgium	1	2	0	1	1	1	5	–4	

27 May 2009	Japan	4–0	Chile	Osaka, Japan
19:35 JST	Okazaki 20', 24'; Abe 53'; Honda 90+2'	(Report) (Report 2)		Stadium: Nagai Stadium; Attendance: 43,531; Referee: Anders Hermansen (Denmark)

29 May 2009	Belgium	1–1	Chile	Chiba, Japan
19:00 JST	Roelandts 17'	(Report)	Medel 23'	Stadium: Fukuda Denshi Arena; Attendance: 6,050; Referee: Minoru Tōjō (Japan)

31 May 2009	Japan	4–0	Belgium	Tokyo, Japan
19:20 JST	Nagatomo 21'; K. Nakamura 23'; Okazaki 60'; Yano 70'	(Report)		Stadium: National Stadium; Attendance: 42,520; Referee: Rob Styles (England)

=== 2011 Kirin Cup Soccer ===
Team	Pld	W	D	L	GS	GA	GD	Pts	Result
Japan	2	0	2	0	0	0	0	2	Joint Champions
Czech Republic	2	0	2	0	0	0	0	2	Joint Champions
Peru	2	0	2	0	0	0	0	2	Joint Champions

1 June 2011	Japan	0–0	Peru	Niigata, Japan
19:20 JST		(Report)		Stadium: Niigata Stadium; Attendance: 39,048; Referee: Howard Webb (England)

4 June 2011	Czech Republic	0–0	Peru	Nagano, Japan
15:00 JST		(Report)		Stadium: Matsumoto Stadium; Attendance: 7,592; Referee: Ryuji Sato (Japan)

7 June 2011	Japan	0–0	Czech Republic	Kanagawa, Japan
19:30 JST		(Report)		Stadium: International Stadium Yokohama; Attendance: 65,856; Referee: Martin Atkinson (England)

=== 2016 Kirin Cup Soccer ===
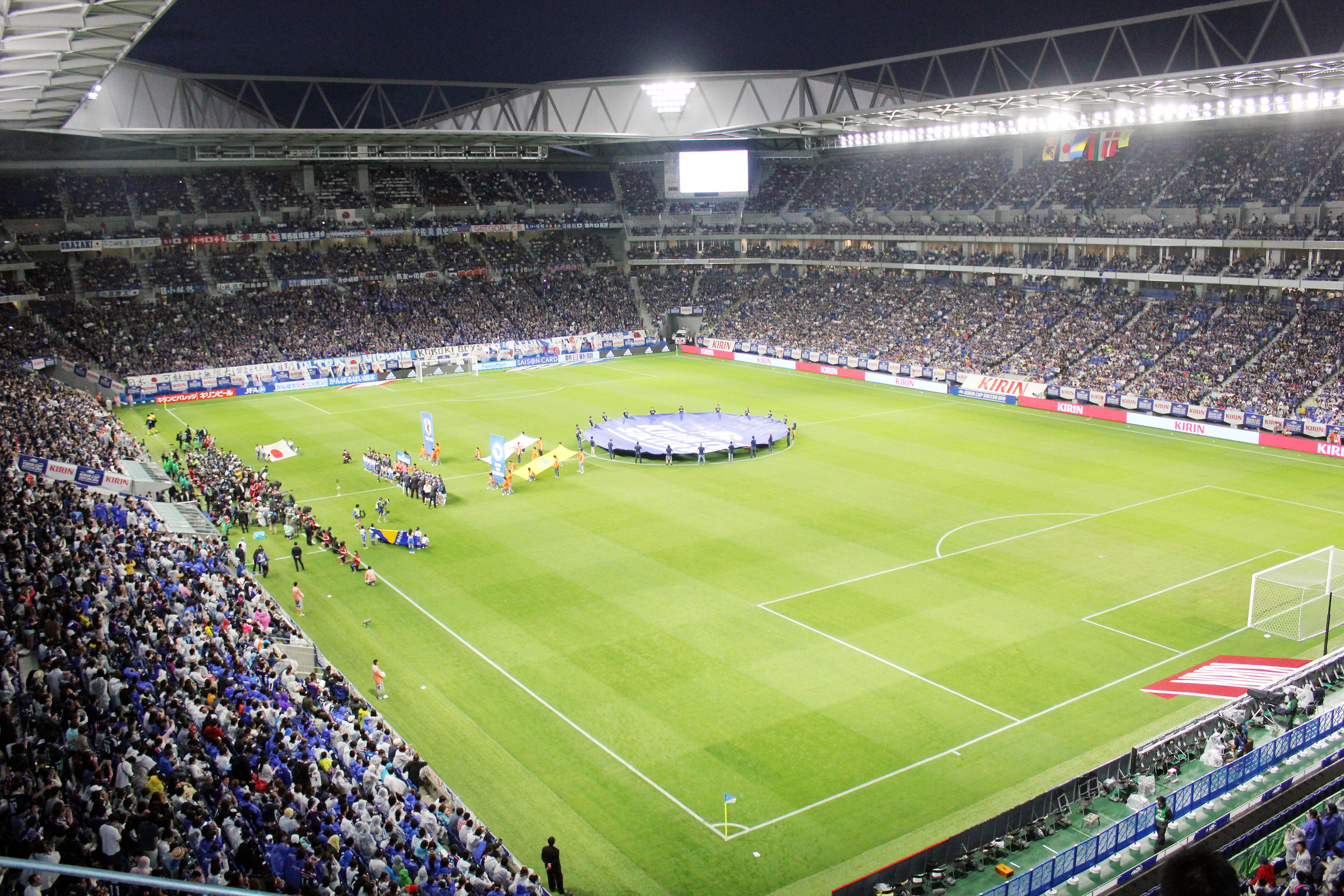
Japan against Bosnia and Herzegovina at Suita City Stadium in Osaka during the final of the 2016 Kirin Cup.

The Kirin Cup returned in 2016, under a new name and format: Kirin Cup Soccer 2016.

Semi-finals
10 June – Toyota
Bosnia and Herzegovina (p)	2 (4)
Denmark	2 (3)
10 June – Toyota
Japan	7
Bulgaria	2

Final
14 June – Suita
Bosnia and Herzegovina	2
Japan	1
Third place match
14 June – Suita
Denmark	4
Bulgaria	0

==== Semi-finals ====
3 June 2016	Bosnia and Herzegovina	2–2 (4–3 p)	Denmark	Toyota, Japan
16:00 JST	Đurić 52', 84'	Report (JFA); Report (JFA)	Kjær 22'; Fischer 41'	Stadium: Toyota Stadium; Attendance: 4,500; Referee: Benjamin Williams (Australia)
	Penalties
	Vrančić (penalty missed); Krunić (penalty scored); Hodžić (penalty scored); Stevanović (penalty scored); Medunjanin (penalty scored)		(penalty scored) Rasmussen; (penalty missed) Vestergaard; (penalty missed) Christensen; (penalty scored) Schöne; (penalty scored) Eriksen

3 June 2016	Japan	7–2	Bulgaria	Toyota, Japan
19:40 JST	Okazaki 4'; Kagawa 27', 35'; Yoshida 38', 53'; Usami 57'; Asano 87' (pen.)	Report (JFA); Report (JFA)	Aleksandrov 59'; Chochev 82'	Stadium: Toyota Stadium; Attendance: 41,940; Referee: Bartosz Frankowski (Poland)

==== Third place match ====
7 June 2016	Denmark	4–0	Bulgaria	Suita, Japan
16:00 JST	Rasmussen 39'; Eriksen 72', 74', 82'	Report (JFA); Report (JFA)		Stadium: Suita City Football Stadium; Attendance: 14,223; Referee: Ryuji Sato (Japan)

==== Final ====
7 June 2016	Bosnia and Herzegovina	2–1	Japan	Suita, Japan
19:30 JST	Đurić 29', 66'	Report (JFA); Report (JFA)	Kiyotake 28'	Stadium: Suita City Football Stadium; Attendance: 35,589; Referee: Jarred Gillett (Australia)

=== 2022 Kirin Cup Soccer ===
2022 Kirin Cup Soccer was held between 10 and 14 June 2022, in a four-nation tournament format. Tunisia won their first title, defeating Japan 3–0 in the final.

Teams

- Japan
- Chile
- Ghana
- Tunisia

Semi-finals
10 June – Kobe
Chile	0
Tunisia	2
10 June – Kobe
Japan	4
Ghana	1

Final
14 June – Osaka
Japan	0
Tunisia	3
Third place match
14 June – Osaka
Chile	0 (1)
Ghana (p)	0 (3)

==== Semi-finals ====
10 June 2022	Chile	0–2	Tunisia	Kobe, Japan
15:15 UTC+9		Report (JFA); Report (JFA)	Abdi 41'; Jebali 89'	Stadium: Noevir Stadium Kobe; Attendance: 4,973; Referee: Ryo Tanimoto (Japan)

10 June 2022	Japan	4–1	Ghana	Kobe, Japan
18:55 UTC+9	Yamane 29'; Mitoma 45+1'; Kubo 73'; Maeda 82'	Report (JFA); Report (JFA)	J. Ayew 43'	Stadium: Noevir Stadium Kobe; Attendance: 25,100; Referee: Kurt Ams (Australia)

==== Third place match ====
14 June 2022	Chile	0–0 (1–3 p)	Ghana	Osaka, Japan
15:15 UTC+9 (Note: Since the match for Japan was set to start at 18:55, the time of the third place match and the final were changed depending on the results of the semi-finals.)		Report (JFA); Report (JFA)		Stadium: Panasonic Stadium Suita; Attendance: 6,185; Referee: Hiroki Kasahara (Japan)
	Penalties
	Fernández (penalty scored); Alarcón (penalty missed); Brereton (penalty missed); Medel (penalty missed)		(penalty scored) J. Ayew; (penalty scored) Kudus; (penalty scored) Issahaku

==== Final ====
14 June 2022	Japan	0–3	Tunisia	Osaka, Japan
18:55 UTC+9		Report (JFA); Report (JFA)	Ben Romdhane 55'; Sassi 76'; Jebali 90+3'	Stadium: Panasonic Stadium Suita; Attendance: 31,292; Referee: Ahmed Eisa Darwish (United Arab Emirates)

=== 2026 Kirin Cup Soccer ===
The 2026 Kirin Cup Soccer was announced on 7 August 2026, set to be played on 1 and 5 October in a four-nation tournament format.

Teams

- Japan
- Ecuador
- New Zealand
- Panama

Semi-finals
1 October – Yokohama
Panama	1 (3)
New Zealand (p)	1 (5)
1 October – Yokohama
Japan (p)	0 (5)
Ecuador	0 (4)

Final
5 October – Tokyo
Japan	2
New Zealand	1
Third place match
5 October – Tokyo
Ecuador	1 (6)
Panama (p)	1 (7)

==== Semi-finals ====
1 October 2026	Panama	1–1 (3–5 p)	New Zealand	Yokohama, Japan
15:10 UTC+9	Herbert 45+1'	Report (JFA); Report (JFA)	Stamenić 13'	Stadium: Nissan Stadium; Attendance: 8,513; Referee: Rubiel Vazquez (United States)
	Penalties
	Murillo (penalty scored); Harvey (penalty scored); Jiménez (penalty missed); Griffith (penalty scored)		(penalty scored) Bindon; (penalty scored) Stamenić; (penalty scored) Dyer; (penalty scored) Bayliss; (penalty scored) Boxall

1 October 2026	Japan	0–0 (5–4 p)	Ecuador	Yokohama, Japan
19:25 UTC+9		Report (JFA); Report (JFA)		Stadium: Nissan Stadium; Attendance: 65,012; Referee: Wiwat Jumpaoon (Thailand)
	Penalties
	Ueda (penalty scored); Kamada (penalty scored); H. Itō (penalty scored); Sōma (penalty scored); Maeda (penalty scored)		(penalty scored) J. Caicedo; (penalty scored) Minda; (penalty missed) Castillo; (penalty scored) Sarmiento; (penalty scored) Valencia

==== Third place match ====
5 October 2026	Ecuador	1–1 (6–7 p)	Panama	Tokyo, Japan
15:30 UTC+9	J. Angulo 58'	Report (JFA); Report (JFA)	Vergara 38'	Stadium: National Stadium; Attendance: 14,364; Referee: Kōki Nagamine (Japan)
	Penalties
	Vite (penalty scored); Valencia (penalty missed); Yeboah (penalty scored); N. Angulo (penalty scored); Arroyo (penalty scored); Pacho (penalty scored); F. Caicedo (penalty scored); J. Angulo (penalty missed)		(penalty scored) Murillo; (penalty scored) Harvey; (penalty missed) Griffith; (penalty scored) T. Rodríguez; (penalty scored) R. Mosquera; (penalty scored) Blackman; (penalty scored) Herbert; (penalty scored) D. Murillo

==== Final ====
5 October 2026	Japan	2–1	New Zealand	Tokyo, Japan
19:30 UTC+9	Ueda 28'; Dōan 71'	Report (JFA); Report (JFA)	Old 32'	Stadium: National Stadium; Attendance: 61,812; Referee: Nazmi Nasaruddin (Malaysia)

== Winners (Kirin Cup Soccer) ==
=== Clubs ===
- 1978: (West Germany) Borussia Mönchengladbach and (Brazil) SE Palmeiras (Shared)
- 1979: (England) Tottenham Hotspur
- 1980: (England) Middlesbrough
- 1981: (Belgium) Club Brugge
- 1982: (West Germany) Werder Bremen
- 1983: (England) Newcastle United
- 1984: (Brazil) Internacional
- 1985: (Brazil) Santos
- 1986: (West Germany) Werder Bremen
- 1987: (Brazil) Fluminense
- 1988: (Brazil) CR Flamengo
- 1989: Not Held
- 1990: Not Held

=== National teams ===
- 1991: Japan
- 1992: Argentina
- 1993: Hungary
- 1994: France
- 1995: Japan
- 1996: Japan
- 1997: Japan
- 1998: Czech Republic
- 1999: Belgium and Peru (Shared)
- 2000: Japan and Slovakia (Shared)
- 2001: Japan
- 2002: No Champions
- 2003: No Champions
- 2004: Japan
- 2005: Peru and United Arab Emirates (Shared)
- 2006: Scotland
- 2007: Japan
- 2008: Japan
- 2009: Japan
- 2010: Not Held
- 2011: Japan, Czech Republic and Peru (Shared)
- 2012: Not Held
- 2013: Not Held
- 2014: Not Held
- 2015: Not Held
- 2016: Bosnia and Herzegovina
- 2017: Not Held
- 2018: Not Held
- 2019: Not Held
- 2020: Not Held
- 2021: Not Held
- 2022: Tunisia
- 2023: Not Held
- 2024: Not Held
- 2025: Not Held
- 2026: Japan

== See also ==
- Kirin Cup Soccer (invitational tournament)
- Kirin Challenge Cup (an international friendly match)
- Kirin Company (JFA official partner)
- FIFA ASEAN Cup
- Sport in Japan
  - Football in Japan
    - Women's football in Japan
- Japan Football Association (JFA)
- Japan national football team
- Japan women's national football team
