= Matthew Edwards =

Matthew Edwards may refer to:

- Matthew Edwards (footballer) (1882–1944), English football player (Barnsley, Crystal Palace and Doncaster Rovers)
- Matthew Edwards (musician), English musician
- Matt Edwards (DJ) (born 1970), English electronic music producer and DJ
- Matt Edwards (footballer) (born 1971), English football player (Reading, Brighton & Hove Albion)
- Matt Edwards (pool player) (born 1987), New Zealand pool player
- Matty Edwards (born 1991), English-born Scottish football player (Rochdale)
- Matthew Edwards (soccer) (born 2003), American soccer player
