= Paulo Cesar =

Paulo César may refer to:

- Caju (real name Paulo Cézar Lima), Brazilian footballer who played at the 1970 and 1974 FIFA World Cup tournaments
- Paulinho da Viola (born 1942), (real name Paulo César Batista de Faria), Brazilian singer-songwriter and musician
- Paulo César (footballer, born 1961), Brazilian football left back
- Paulo César (footballer, born 1979), Brazilian football midfielder
- Paulo César (footballer, born 1986), Hong Kong football goalkeeper
- Paulo César Arruda Parente (born 1978), Brazilian fullback (2000s: PSG et al.)
- Paulo César Borges (born 1960), Brazilian goalkeeper (1980s–90s)
- Paulo César Camassutti (born 1960), Brazilian footballer (1980s)
- Paulo César Carpegiani (born 1949), Brazilian footballer (1970s) / manager (1980s-90s)
- Paulo César de Melo da Silva (born 1971), Brazilian footballer (1990s)
- Paulo César de Oliveira (born 1973), Brazilian football referee
- Paulo Cesar Duque-Estrada (born 1956), Brazilian philosopher
- Paulo Cesar Farias (1945–1996), Brazilian campaign treasurer of Fernando Collor de Mello
- Paulo César Gusmão (born 1962), Brazilian goalkeeper (1980s) & manager (1990s - 2000s)
- Paulo César Martin (1964–2026), Brazilian journalist, radio host and podcaster
- Paulo César Motta (born 1982), Guatemalan professional goalkeeper
- Paulo César Pereio (1940–2024), Brazilian actor
- Paulo César Pinheiro (born 1949), Brazilian poet and composer
- Paulo César Rocha Rosa (born 1980), Brazilian footballer for FC Braga
- Paulo César Saraceni (1933–2012), Brazilian film director and screenwriter
- Paulo César Wanchope Watson (born 1976), Costa Rican footballer (1990s-2000s)
- Tinga (footballer, born 1978) (real name Paulo César Fonseca do Nascimento), Brazilian midfielder (2000s: Grêmio et al.)
