= Maruyama Park =

Maruyama Park may refer to:

- Maruyama Park (Kyoto)
- Maruyama Park (Sapporo)
