= Sapporo Maruyama Zoo =

Coordinates: 43°03′05″N 141°18′27″E

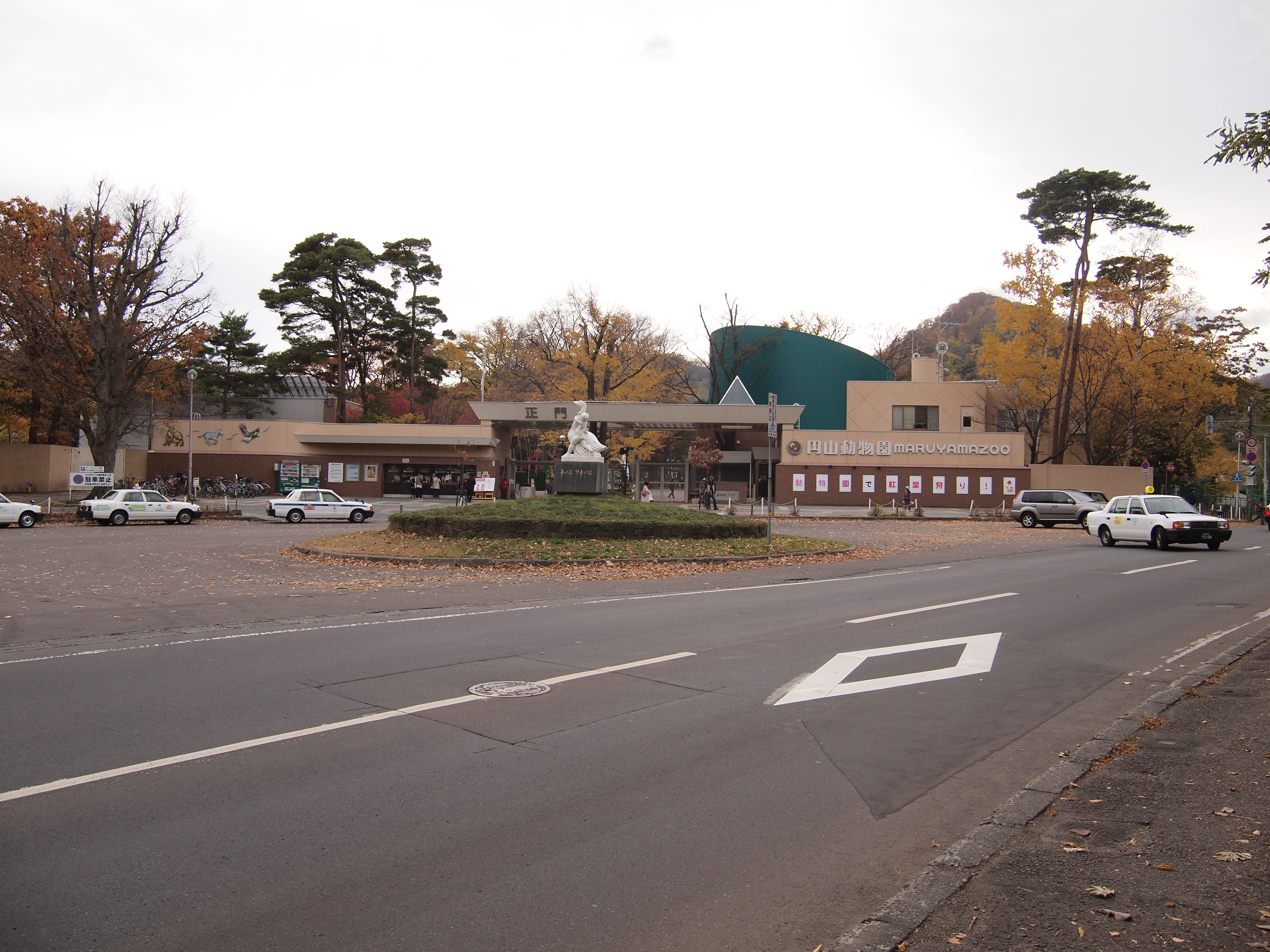
- Main gate of Sapporo Maruyama Zoo
- Interactive map of Sapporo Maruyama Zoo
- Date opened: May 5, 1951; 75 years ago
- Location: Chūō-ku, Sapporo, Hokkaido, Japan
- Land area: 22.5 ha
- No. of animals: 737
- No. of species: 168
- Owner: Sapporo City
- Website: www.city.sapporo.jp/zoo

Sapporo Maruyama Zoo (札幌市円山動物園, Sapporo Maruyama Dōbutsuen) is a municipal zoo in Chūō-ku, Sapporo, Hokkaido, Japan. It opened on May 5, 1951.

The zoo is located within Maruyama Park in western Sapporo, and is the oldest zoo in Hokkaido.

== History ==
Sapporo Maruyama Zoo officially opened in 1951 with its origin stemming from hosting a travelling zoo for the "Ueno Zoo". While hosting the travelling zoo, it received such a overwhelmingly good response from the residence that the City of Sapporo decided to open a zoo itself. The theme and the overarching philosophy of the Maruyama Zoo was to create habitats that mimic the natural environments that the animals originate from. Therefore, the exhibits host a variety of different habitats for various different animals with themes that correspond to their natural habitat. Throughout the decades the Zoo has opened new exhibits, notably the Wakuwaku Asia Zone that opened in 2012, and the Polar Bear Pavilion that opened in 2018; with the Polar bear Pavilion being the largest polar bear exhibit in Japan.

== Incidents ==
Starting in 2010, the zoo tried for four years to mate two hyenas until they discovered they were both males.

== Access ==
The zoo is approximately 15 minutes' walk from Maruyama-Kōen Station on the Tōzai Line.

== Attractions and Animals ==
Sapporo Maruyama Zoo covers an area of 22.5 ha, and is home to 168 different species and 737 animals.

| Exhibits | Animals |
|---|---|
| Polar bear pavilion (Opened in 2018) | Polar bear; Spotted seal; Harbor seal |
| Asian elephant house (Opened in 2018) | Asian elephant |
| Africa Zone (Fully opened in 2016) Africa zone consists of two pavilions, "Giraffe pavilion" and "Hippo and lion pavilion" . | |
| Giraffe pavilion | Reticulated giraffe; Common ostrich; Naked mole rat; Meerkat; Serval |
| Hippo and lion pavilion | Great white pelican; Hippopotamus; Grant's Zebra; African lion |
| Wakuwaku Asia Zone (Opened in 2012) Asia zone consists of three pavilions, "Frigid Zone pavilion", "Highlands pavilion", and "Tropical Rainforest pavilion". | |
| Frigid Zone pavilion | Amur tiger; Snow leopard |
| Highlands pavilion | Red panda; Asian black bear |
| Tropical Rainforest pavilion | Lion-tailed macaque; Celebes crested macaque; Asian small-clawed otter; Gibbon; Lar Gibbon |
| Reptile House (Opened in 2011) | Aldabra giant tortoise; False gharial; Chinese alligator; Rhinoceros iguana; Burmese python; Green anaconda; Asian water monitor; Gila monster; Yellow-banded poison dart frog; Cobalt Tree monitor; Ezo Brown Frog; Ezo Salamander; Japanese rat snake; Japanese forest rat snake; Mamushi |
| Yezo sika deer and wolf house | Yezo sika deer; Timberwolf |
| Yezo brown bear pavilion | Yezo brown bear |
| Chimpanzee pavilion | Chimpanzee |
| Snow monkey mountain | Japanese macaque |
| Tropical bird pavilion | American flamingo; Chilean flamingo; Red-capped cardinal; Mandarin duck; Toco toucan; Indian peafowl; Southern coati |
| Water bird house | Red-crowned crane; Humboldt penguin; White stork |
| Birds of prey house | Steller's sea eagle; Japanese golden eagle; White-tailed eagle; Eurasian eagle-owl; Blakiston's fish owl |
| Forest of owls and hawks | Hokkaido Ural owl; Snowy owl; Black kite; Japanese buzzard; Great horned owl |
| Monkey House | Ruffed lemur; Ring-tailed lemur; Tufted capuchin; Diana monkey; Olive baboon; Mandrill; De Brazza's monkey |
| Kangaroo pavilion | Eastern grey kangaroo; Sunda slow loris; Galah; Bali Myna; Black-tailed prairie dog; Yezo tanuk |
| Children's Zoo | Common squirrel monkey; North American beaver; Raccoon; Siberian flying squirrel; Hokkaido Squirrel; Mountain hare; Guinea pig; Chinese goose; Sheep; Pony; Call duck; Domestic rabbit; Onagadori |
| Orangutan and Bornean Forest (Opened in spring 2024) | Bornean orangutan |

== See also ==
- Japanese Association of Zoos and Aquariums (JAZA)
- Maruyama Park
