= 1979–80 KNVB Cup =

Tournament details
- Country: Netherlands
- Teams: 46

Final positions
- Champions: Feyenoord
- Runners-up: Ajax

The 1979-80 KNVB Cup 62nd edition of the Dutch national football annual knockout tournament for the KNVB Cup. 46 teams contested, beginning on 1 September 1979 and ending at the final on 17 May 1980.

Ajax unsuccessfully defended its 1979 title in the successful pursuit of Feyenoord at the KNVB Cup on 17 May 1980 in De Kuip, Rotterdam, 3–1. 60,000 attended. Feyenoord contested the Cup Winners' Cup.

During the quarter and semi-finals, two-legged matches were held.

== Teams ==
- All 18 participants of the Eredivisie 1979-80, entering in the second round
- All 19 participants of the Eerste Divisie 1979-80
- 9 teams from lower (amateur) leagues

== First round ==
The matches of the first round were played on 1-2 September 1979.

Home team	Result	Away team
Fortuna Sittard _{1}	2–1	SC Heracles _{1}
sc Heerenveen _{1}	2–1 (aet)	SC Veendam _{1}
SC Amersfoort _{1}	4–0	EHC _{A}
SVV _{1}	(p) 1-1	ROHDA Raalte _{A}
Telstar _{1}	2–1	RVC '33 _{A}
FC Volendam _{1}	0–1	SC Cambuur _{1}
FC Wageningen _{1}	1–2	RKAV Volendam _{A}

Home team	Result	Away team
Achilles '29 _{A}	0–1	VUC _{A}
VV DOVO _{A}	5–3 (aet)	ACV _{A}
DS '79 _{1}	2–1	Helmond Sport _{1}
FC Eindhoven _{1}	(p) 2-2	FC Vlaardingen _{1}
FC Amsterdam _{1}	3–0	VV Geldrop/AEK _{A}
FC Den Bosch _{1}	(p) 0-0	FC Groningen _{1}
FC VVV _{1}	0–4	De Graafschap _{1}

_{1} Eerste Divisie; _{A} Amateur teams

== Second round ==
The matches of the second round were played on October 13 and 14, 1979. The Eredivisie clubs entered the tournament here.

Home team	Result	Away team
NAC _{E}	1–2	FC Amsterdam
NEC _{E}	4–1	RKAV Volendam
Roda JC _{E}	3–0	sc Heerenveen
SC Cambuur	1–4	PSV _{E}
SVV	0–6	AZ'67 _{E}
Telstar	0–4	Go Ahead Eagles _{E}
Vitesse Arnhem _{E}	3–1	MVV _{E}
Willem II _{E}	2–4	FC Twente _{E}

Home team	Result	Away team
De Graafschap	2–2 (p)	SC Amersfoort
VV DOVO	1–4	PEC Zwolle _{E}
FC Eindhoven	1–2	DS '79
Excelsior _{E}	0–1	Sparta _{E}
FC Den Bosch	0–3	FC Utrecht _{E}
FC Den Haag _{E}	5–1	VUC
Feyenoord _{E}	3–2	Fortuna Sittard
HFC Haarlem _{E}	2–4	Ajax _{E}

_{E} Eredivisie

== Round of 16 ==
The matches of the round of 16 were played between February 13 and 17, 1980.

Home team	Result	Away team
Ajax	3–1	Vitesse Arnhem
AZ'67	2–0	FC Utrecht
DS '79	1–3	PEC Zwolle
Feyenoord	4–0	FC Twente
Go Ahead Eagles	1–2 (aet)	Sparta
PSV	3–0	FC Amsterdam
Roda JC	5–1	NEC
SC Amersfoort	1–8	FC Den Haag

== Quarter finals ==
The quarter finals were played on February 27 and March 12, 1980.

Team 1	Aggregate	Team 2	Match 1	Match 2
Ajax	9–5	Roda JC	5–1	4–4
AZ'67	2–2 (a)	Sparta	2–1	0–1
FC Den Haag	3–4	PSV	3–1	0–3
Feyenoord	5–2	PEC Zwolle	3–0	2–2

== Semi-finals ==
The semi-finals were played on April 16 and 30, 1980.

Team 1	Aggregate	Team 2	Match 1	Match 2
PSV	2–3	Ajax	1–2	1–1
Sparta	1–4	Feyenoord	1–0	0–4

== Final ==
17 May 1980

Feyenoord	3–1	Ajax
Pétursson 39' (pen.), 75'; De Leeuw 71'		Arnesen 19'

De Kuip, Rotterdam
Attendance: 60,000
Referee: Charles Corver

Feyenoord would participate in the Cup Winners' Cup.
