= Hokkaidō Shrine =

Shinto shrine in Sapporo, Hokkaido, Japan

Hokkaidō Shrine (北海道神宮, Hokkaidō Jingū)
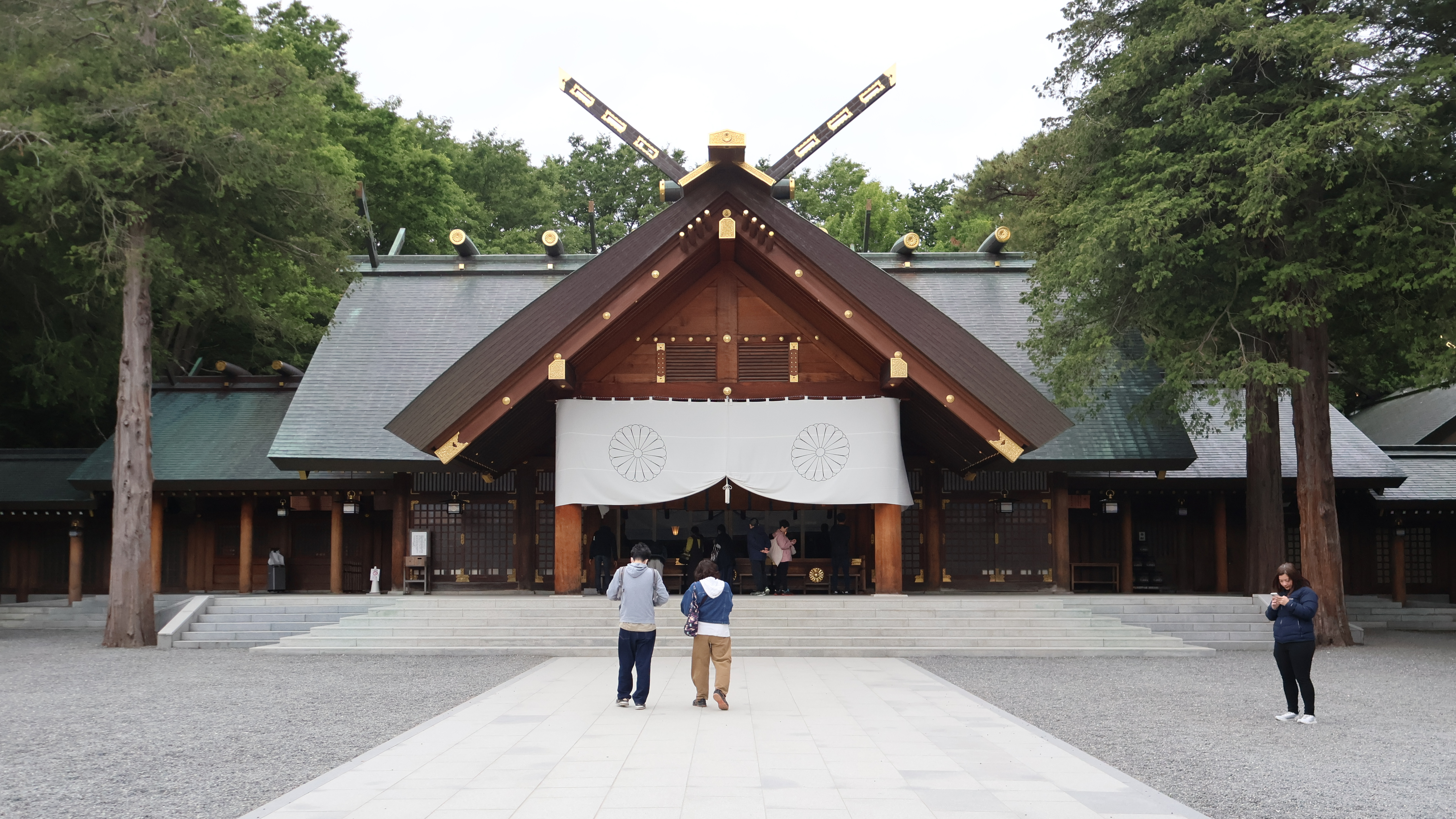
- Hokkaido Shrine

- Location within Japan

Religion
- Affiliation: Shinto
- Deity: Ōkunitama, Ōkuninushi, and Sukunahikona

Location
- Location: Maruyama Park, 474 Miyagaoka, Chūō-ku, Sapporo, Hokkaido 064-8505, Japan
- Coordinates: 43°3′15.24697″N 141°18′27.73923″E

Architecture
- Established: 1871

The Hokkaidō Shrine (北海道神宮, Hokkaidō Jingū), named the Sapporo Shrine (札幌神社, Sapporo Jinja) until 1964, is a Shinto shrine located in Sapporo, Hokkaido, Japan. Sited in Maruyama Park, Chūō-ku, Sapporo, Hokkaido, the Hokkaido Shrine enshrines four kami including the soul of the Emperor Meiji. A number of early explorers of Hokkaidō such as Mamiya Rinzō are also enshrined.

== History ==
In 1869, by an order of the Emperor Meiji, a ceremony to enshrine three kami (Shinto deities); Ōkunitama, Ōkuninushi, and Sukunahikona, was held in Tokyo. They were enshrined as the three pioneer kami (開拓三神, Kaitaku Sanjin), and they were later moved to Sapporo by officers in the Kaitakushi, the previous government of Hokkaidō prefecture. An interim building of the shrine for three kami was constructed in 1870 in Sapporo, although its location was different from the current point where the Hokkaidō Shrine stands. In 1871, the shrine was erected in its current place and named "Sapporo Shrine" (Sapporo Jinja), and on September 14 an inaugural ceremony was held.

The three pioneer deities were important in the development of a "pioneer theology" which was significant to the early development of State Shinto.

In 1964, Sapporo-jinja was renamed the "Hokkaidō Shrine" (Hokkaidō Jingū) and officially upgraded to one of the Kanpei-taisha (官幣大社), meaning that it stood in the first rank of government supported shrines. The soul of Emperor Meiji was also newly enshrined there in 1964. The building was destroyed by a fire in 1974, but was later restored in 1978.

== Overview ==
The area of the Hokkaido Shrine is 180,000 m^{2}, and is adjacent to Maruyama Park. During the season which cherry blossoms in the area bloom, the shrine is crowded with people enjoying Hanami. Many people also visit the shrine during Japanese New Year to go Hatsumōde.

From June 14 to 16 in every year, the Main festival of Hokkaido Shrine, also called "Sapporo Festival" (Sapporo Matsuri), is held, and the line of people bearing Mikoshi parades down the street which leads to the shrine. It also manages Scouting activities.

== See also ==
- List of Shinto shrines
- Twenty-Two Shrines
- Modern system of ranked Shinto Shrines
