= Kamel Djahmoune =

Algerian footballer (born 1961)

Personal information
- Date of birth: 16 June 1961 (age 65)
- Place of birth: El Affroun, Algeria
- Position: Forward

Senior career*
Years	Team	Apps	(Gls)
1980-1984	NCB El Affroun		
1984-1987	USM Blida		
1987-1989	MC Alger		
1989-1990	FC Metz		
1989-1990	→FC Didji (loan)		
1990-1991	NCB El Affroun		
1991-1994	CR Belouizdad		
1994-1997	Olympique de Médéa		
1997-1998	IRB Hadjout		
1998-1999	CA Aïn Defla		

International career
1986–1988	Algeria	6	(1)
- * Club domestic league appearances and goals

Kamel Djahmoune (born 16 June 1961) is an Algerian footballer. He played in six matches for the Algeria national football team in 1986 and 1988. He was also named in Algeria's squad for the 1988 African Cup of Nations tournament.
