= Carlo de Leeuw =

Dutch footballer (1960–2020)

Personal information
- Full name: Carlo de Leeuw
- Date of birth: 12 December 1960
- Place of birth: Rotterdam, Netherlands
- Date of death: 13 February 2020 (aged 59)
- Place of death: Valkenswaard, Netherlands
- Height: 1.82 m (6 ft 0 in)
- Position: Left winger

Youth career
- 1968–1977: Feyenoord

Senior career*
Years	Team	Apps	(Gls)
1978–1983	Feyenoord	45	(7)
1982–1983	→ Excelsior (loan)	31	(7)
1983–1989	Cambuur	172	(22)
1986	→ Excelsior (loan)	12	(2)
1989–1991	Eindhoven	60	(3)
1991–1992	Volendam	22	(2)
1992–1993	Eindhoven	23	(3)
Total		365	(46)

International career^{‡}
1978–1979	Netherlands U-19	7	(2)
- * Club domestic league appearances and goals as of 15 February 2020 ‡ National team caps and goals as of 15 February 2020

Carlo de Leeuw (12 December 1960 – 13 February 2020) was a Dutch footballer.

== Club career ==
A talented forward, De Leeuw came through the youth system of hometown club Feyenoord and made his professional debut for them against Excelsior on 23 September 1979. He won a penalty and scored one of their goals in the 1980 Cup final against eternal rivals Ajax. After four years he joined city rivals Excelsior for whom he had two different spells. He made his debut for them on 22 August 1982 against his former club Feyenoord. He scored 25 goals in 184 league and cup games for Cambuur between 1983 and 1989 and was voted best Cambuur midfielder of all-time in 2007. He played another 88 games for FC Eindhoven between 1989 and 1993 and had a season at FC Volendam for whom he played 22 matches in the 1991–92 season.

After being released by Eindhoven, he had a spell at amateur side Witgoor Dessel in Belgium.

== International career ==
He played 7 games for the Netherlands U-19 team, scoring 2 goals, between July 1978 and April 1979.

== Later years ==
After retiring as a player, he became kit man at Feyenoord and the national team in 2002.

== Personal life ==
In summer 2019, de Leeuw was diagnosed with tongue cancer and he died on 13 February 2020.

== Honours ==
- KNVB Cup: 1

1980
