= Maruyama Baseball Stadium =

Baseball stadium in Japan

Coordinates: 43°03′08″N 141°18′21″E

Sapporo Maruyama Baseball Stadium
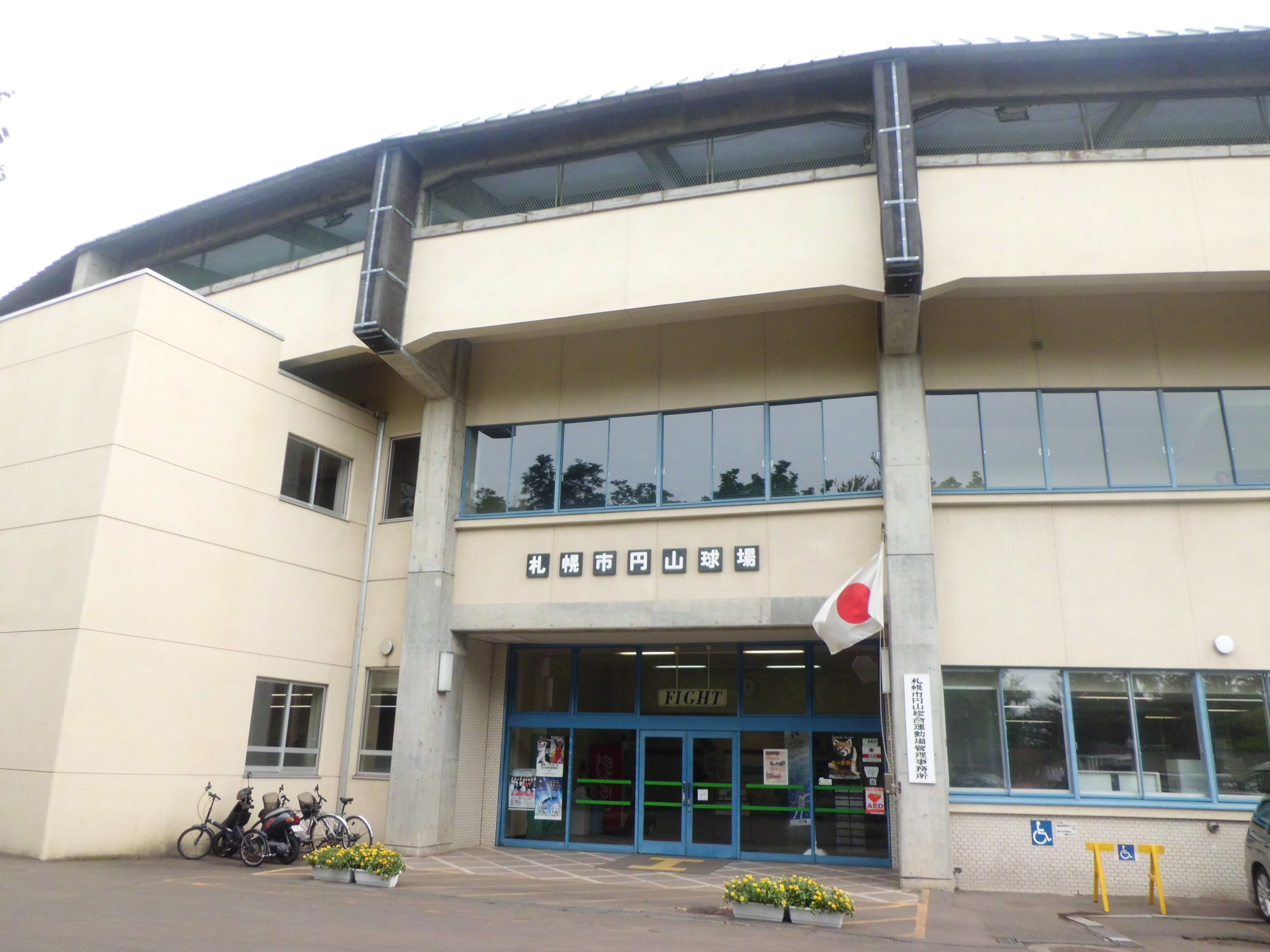
- Interactive map of Sapporo Maruyama Baseball Stadium
- Location: Chūō-ku, Sapporo, Japan
- Owner: Sapporo City
- Capacity: 25,000
- Field size: Left Field: 98 m Center Field: 117 m Right Field: 98m

Construction
- Opened: 1934

Tenant
- Sapporo Health Sports Foundation

Sapporo Maruyama Baseball Stadium (札幌市円山球場), is a baseball stadium in Sapporo, Hokkaidō, Japan. The stadium holds 25,000 people, was built in 1934 and is currently used for high-school and amateur baseball games.

It is located at the Maruyama Sports complex, next to the Sapporo Maruyama Athletics Stadium, going uphill within the Maruyama Park.
