= Maruyama Park (Sapporo) =

Park in Sapporo

Maruyama Park (円山公園, Maruyama Kōen)
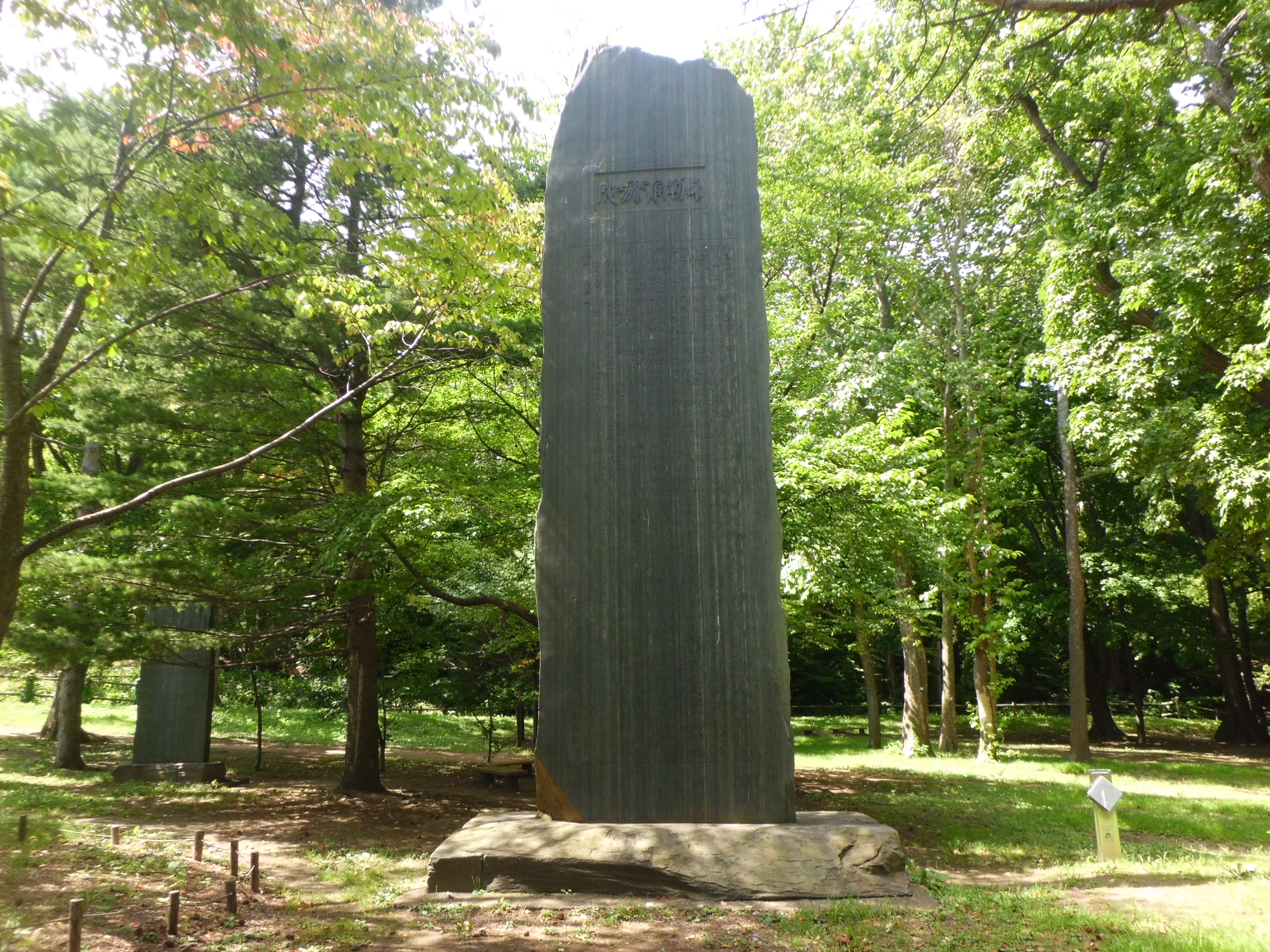
- Interactive map of Maruyama Park (円山公園, Maruyama Kōen)
- Type: Urban park
- Location: Chūō-ku, Sapporo, Hokkaido, Japan
- Coordinates: 43.05075°N 141.309583°E
- Area: 68.7 hectares (170 acres)
- Created: 1957

Maruyama Park (円山公園, Maruyama Kōen) is a park in Chūō-ku, Sapporo, Hokkaido, Japan.

The park is home to a number of attractions such as, the Hokkaidō Shrine, the Maruyama Zoo, the Maruyama Baseball Stadium and the Maruyama Athletics Stadium.

== History ==
Prior to the construction of Maruyama Park, in 1875, 150 trees were planted on the road to the Hokkaidō Shrine as part of a city planning project. Many years later, after the opening of Sapporo Maruyama Zoo in 1951, the park was taking form, and in 1957 it was officially opened.

== Overview ==
Located in the western suburbs of Sapporo under the Maruyama mountain, in the north part of the Maruyama Forest. The park contains virgin forest with Oak, Katsura (Japanese Judas tree), Magnolia, Maple and other varieties of trees, and is a designated natural monument. On the hillside of the park, there are giant Elm and Cypress trees where different bird species gather. With over 1,500 sakura trees the park is the most popular hanami place in the city of Sapporo.

The Hokkaidō Shrine located at the north end of the park, opened on 1869, is the most important Shinto shrine of the City.

The park contains the Maruyama Baseball Stadium, opened on 1934, it was the main baseball park of the city, before the opening of the Sapporo Dome (2001). In front of baseball stadium is the Maruyama Athletics Stadium, also opened the same year, is utilized for track and field competitions, at local and national level.

Sapporo Maruyama Zoo, opened on 1951, covers an area of 22.5 ha.

The park also contains some sports grounds (tennis courts). Also in the park is the theme park, Maruyama Kids' Land.

== Access ==
- Tōzai Line: 3 minutes walking distance from Maruyama-Kōen Station
