= Matt Edwards (footballer) =

English footballer (born 1971)

Personal information
- Full name: Matthew David Edwards
- Date of birth: 15 June 1971 (age 55)
- Place of birth: Hammersmith, England
- Height: 5 ft 11 in (1.80 m)
- Position: Winger

Senior career*
| Years | Team | Apps | (Gls) |
| 1989–1991 | Tottenham Hotspur | 0 | (0) |
| 1991 | → Reading (loan) | 8 | (0) |
| 1992 | → Peterborough United (loan) | 0 | (0) |
| 1992–1994 | Brighton & Hove Albion | 60 | (6) |
| 1994–1995 | Kettering Town | 2 | (0) |
| 1995 | → Walton & Hersham (loan) | | |
| 1995–1996 | Walton & Hersham | | |
| 1996–1997 | Enfield | | |
| 1997–1998 | Carshalton Athletic | | |
- Sutton United
- Molesey
- Yeading
- Bognor Regis Town
- Egham Town
- * Club domestic league appearances and goals

Matthew David Edwards (born 15 June 1971) is an English former professional footballer who played as a winger. He made 68 Football League appearances playing for Reading and Brighton & Hove Albion. He was on the books of Tottenham Hotspur without playing first-team football, appeared once for Peterborough United in the Associate Members' Cup, and played non-league football for clubs including Kettering Town, where he missed the whole 1994–95 Football Conference season through injury, Walton & Hersham (initially on loan), Enfield, Carshalton Athletic, Sutton United, Molesey, Yeading, Bognor Regis Town and Egham Town.
