= Paulo César (footballer, born 1961) =

Brazilian footballer

Personal information
- Full name: Alberto Ribeiro Neves
- Date of birth: 3 February 1962 (age 64)
- Place of birth: Itabuna, Brazil
- Position: Left back

Youth career
- Itabuna

Senior career*
Years	Team	Apps	(Gls)
1981–1984	Itabuna		
1985–1988	America-RJ		
1988–1989	Flamengo		
1989–1991	Cruzeiro		
1991–1992	Bahia		
1997	Itabuna		
- * Club domestic league appearances and goals as of 4 June 2024

Alberto Ribeiro Neves (born 3 February 1961), better known as Paulo César, is a Brazilian former professional footballer who played as a left back.

== Career ==
Formed at Itabuna EC, Paulo César moved to America in 1985, being the highlight of the semi-finalist team of the 1986 Campeonato Brasileiro Série A. He had spells at CR Flamengo, Cruzeiro EC and EC Bahia, but without being able to repeat the same performance at the beginning of the career. He retired in 1997 for Itabuna.

== Honours ==
Flamengo

- Taça Guanabara: 1989

Cruzeiro

- Campeonato Mineiro: 1990
